

Deaths in October

 4: Peter Warr
23: Fran Crippen
26: Paul the Octopus

Current sporting seasons

American football 2010

National Football League
NCAA Division I FBS
NCAA Division I FCS

Auto racing 2010

Formula One
Sprint Cup
World Rally Championship
Nationwide Series
Camping World Truck Series
GP2 Series
WTTC
V8 Supercar
Superleague Formula
FIA GT1 World Championship
World Series by Renault
Deutsche Tourenwagen Masters
Super GT

Baseball 2010

Major League Baseball
Nippon Professional Baseball

Basketball 2010

NBA
Euroleague
EuroLeague Women
Eurocup
EuroChallenge
France
Germany
Greece
Israel
Italy
Philippines
Philippine Cup
Russia
Spain
Turkey

Canadian football 2010

Canadian Football League

Football (soccer) 2010

National teams competitions
UEFA Euro 2012 qualifying
2011 FIFA Women's World Cup qualification
2012 Africa Cup of Nations qualification
International clubs competitions
UEFA (Europe) Champions League
Europa League
UEFA Women's Champions League
Copa Sudamericana
AFC (Asia) Champions League
AFC Cup
CAF (Africa) Champions League
CAF Confederation Cup
CONCACAF (North & Central America) Champions League
OFC (Oceania) Champions League
Domestic (national) competitions
Argentina
Australia
Brazil
England
France
Germany
Iran
Italy
Japan
Norway
Russia
Scotland
Spain
Major League Soccer (USA & Canada)
MLS Cup Playoffs

Golf 2010

PGA Tour
European Tour
LPGA Tour
Champions Tour

Ice hockey 2010

National Hockey League
Kontinental Hockey League
Czech Extraliga
Elitserien
Canadian Hockey League:
OHL, QMJHL, WHL
NCAA Division I men
NCAA Division I women

Lacrosse 2010

Major League Lacrosse

Motorcycle racing 2010

Moto GP

Rugby league 2010

Four Nations

Rugby union 2010

2011 Rugby World Cup qualifying
Heineken Cup
European Challenge Cup
English Premiership
Celtic League
Top 14
ITM Cup
Currie Cup

Snooker

Players Tour Championship

Winter sports

Alpine Skiing World Cup
Grand Prix of Figure Skating
Short Track Speed Skating World Cup
Snowboard World Cup

Days of the month

October 31, 2010 (Sunday)

American football
NFL, Week 8:
International Series in London: San Francisco 49ers 24, Denver Broncos 16
Detroit Lions 37, Washington Redskins 25
Jacksonville Jaguars 35, Dallas Cowboys 17
Miami Dolphins 22, Cincinnati Bengals 14
Kansas City Chiefs 13, Buffalo Bills 10 (OT)
St. Louis Rams 20, Carolina Panthers 10
Green Bay Packers 9, New York Jets 0
San Diego Chargers 33, Tennessee Titans 25
Tampa Bay Buccaneers 38, Arizona Cardinals 35
New England Patriots 28, Minnesota Vikings 18
Oakland Raiders 33, Seattle Seahawks 3
Sunday Night Football: New Orleans Saints 20, Pittsburgh Steelers 10
Byes: Atlanta Falcons, Baltimore Ravens, Chicago Bears, Cleveland Browns, New York Giants, Philadelphia Eagles

Auto racing
Chase for the Sprint Cup:
AMP Energy Juice 500 in Talladega: (1)  Clint Bowyer (Chevrolet; Richard Childress Racing) (2)  Kevin Harvick (Chevrolet; Richard Childress Racing) (3)  Juan Pablo Montoya (Chevrolet; Earnhardt Ganassi Racing)
Drivers' championship standings (after 33 of 36 races): (1)  Jimmie Johnson (Chevrolet; Hendrick Motorsports) 6149 points (2)  Denny Hamlin (Toyota; Joe Gibbs Racing) 6135 (3) Harvick 6111
World Touring Car Championship:
Race of Japan:
Round 19: (1) Rob Huff  (Chevrolet; Chevrolet Cruze) (2) Yvan Muller  (Chevrolet; Chevrolet Cruze) (3) Norbert Michelisz  (Zengő-Dension Team; SEAT León)
Round 20: (1) Colin Turkington  (Team Aviva–COFCO / WSR; BMW 320si) (2) Muller (3) Huff
On November 16, BMW Team RBM drivers Augusto Farfus  and Andy Priaulx  were excluded from the results due to the revoking of a stewards' decision. (WTCC)
Drivers' championship standings (after 20 of 22 rounds): (1) Muller 301 points (2) Gabriele Tarquini  (SR-Sport; SEAT León) 246 (3) Priaulx 240
Muller wins his second world title.
Manufacturers' championship standings: (1) Chevrolet 645 points (2) SEAT Customers Technology 571 (3) BMW 544

Badminton
BWF Super Series:
Denmark Super Series in Odense:
Men's singles: Jan Ø. Jørgensen  def. Taufik Hidayat  21–19, 21–19
Women's singles: Wang Yihan  def. Liu Xin  21–14, 21–12
Men's doubles: Mathias Boe  / Carsten Mogensen  def. Markis Kido  / Hendra Setiawan  21–13, 21–12
Women's doubles: Miyuki Maeda  / Satoko Suetsuna  def. Shizuka Matsuo  / Mami Naito  21–17, 21–14
Mixed doubles: Thomas Laybourn  / Kamilla Rytter Juhl  def. Nathan Robertson  / Jenny Wallwork  21–12, 12–21, 21–9

Baseball
World Series:
Game 4, San Francisco Giants 4, Texas Rangers 0. Giants lead series 3–1.
Japan Series:
Game 2, Chunichi Dragons 12, Chiba Lotte Marines 1. Series tied 1–1.

Cricket
Pakistan vs South Africa in UAE:
2nd ODI in Abu Dhabi:  286/8 (50 overs; Colin Ingram 100);  289/9 (49.5 overs; Abdul Razzaq 109*). Pakistan win by 1 wicket; 5-match series tied 1–1.
Sri Lanka in Australia:
Only T20I in Perth:  133/8 (20 overs);  135/3 (16.3 overs). Sri Lanka win by 7 wickets; win the 1-match series 1–0.

English billiards
World Professional Championship in Leeds, England:
Final: Dhruv Sitwala  1204–1738 Mike Russell 
Russell wins the title for the 10th time.

Equestrianism
Show jumping:
FEI World Cup Western European League:
3rd competition in Lyon (CSI 5*-W):  Meredith Michaels-Beerbaum  on Checkmate  Gerco Schröder  on New Orleans  Rene Lopez  on Noblesse des Tess
Standings (after 3 of 13 competitions): (1) Christian Ahlmann  40 points (2) Kevin Staut  32 (3) Leon Thijssen  27
 5th competition in Hanover (CSI 3*):  Eva Bitter  on Satisfaction  Hugo Simon  on Ukinda  Torben Köhlbrandt  on Picadilly Princess
Standings (after 5 of 6 competitions): (1) Denis Lynch  45 points (2) Heiko Schmidt  41 (3) Bitter 40

Figure skating
ISU Grand Prix:
Skate Canada International in Kingston, Ontario:
Ice Dance:  Vanessa Crone / Paul Poirier  154.42  Sinead Kerr / John Kerr  149.80  Madison Chock / Greg Zuerlein  139.05
Standings (after 2 of 6 events): Meryl Davis / Charlie White , Crone / Poirier 15 points (1 event), Kerr / Kerr, Kaitlyn Weaver / Andrew Poje  13 (1), Chock / Zuerlein, Maia Shibutani / Alex Shibutani  11 (1).

Football (soccer)
African Women's Championship in South Africa:
Group A:  2–1 
CONCACAF Women's Gold Cup in Cancún, Mexico: (teams in bold advance to the semifinals)
Group A:
 8–0 
 2–0 
Standings (after 2 matches): Canada, Mexico 6 points, Trinidad and Tobago, Guyana 0.
CAF Champions League Final, first leg:
TP Mazembe  5–0  Espérance ST
  MLS Cup Playoffs
Western Conference Semifinal, first leg in Seattle:
Seattle Sounders FC 0–1 Los Angeles Galaxy

Golf
European Tour:
Andalucia Masters in Sotogrande, Spain:
Winner: Graeme McDowell  281 (−3)
McDowell collects his third European Tour win of the season and seventh of his career.
LPGA Tour:
LPGA Hana Bank Championship in Incheon, South Korea:
Winner: Na Yeon Choi  206 (−10)
Choi successfully defends her title in the LPGA's annual stop in her homeland for her second LPGA title of the season and fourth of her career.
Champions Tour:
AT&T Championship in San Antonio:
Winner: Rod Spittle  201 (−12)PO
Spittle, a Monday qualifier, defeats Jeff Sluman  on the first playoff hole to win his first Champions Tour title.
Other news: Lee Westwood  will become #1 in the Official World Golf Rankings, ending the five-year reign of Tiger Woods , when the rankings are released tomorrow.

Korfball
European Championship final round in Rotterdam, Netherlands:
7th–8th places:  15–23 
5th–6th places:  21–16 
3rd–4th places:  11–18  
Final:   21–25  
The Netherlands win their fourth successive title.

Motorcycle racing
Moto GP:
Portuguese Grand Prix in Estoril:
MotoGP: (1) Jorge Lorenzo  (Yamaha) (2) Valentino Rossi  (Yamaha) (3) Andrea Dovizioso  (Honda)
Riders' championship standings (after 17 of 18 rounds): (1) Lorenzo 358 points (2) Dani Pedrosa  (Honda) 236 (3) Rossi 217
Manufacturers' championship standings: (1) Yamaha 379 points (2) Honda 331 (3) Ducati 266
Moto2: (1) Stefan Bradl  (Suter) (2) Alex Baldolini  (I.C.P.) (3) Alex de Angelis  (Motobi)
Riders' championship standings (after 16 of 17 rounds): (1) Toni Elías  (Moriwaki) 271 points (2) Julián Simón  (Suter) 185 (3) Andrea Iannone  (Speed Up) 179
Manufacturers' championship standings: (1) Suter 306 points (2) Moriwaki 296 (3) Speed Up 212
125cc: (1) Marc Márquez  (Derbi) (2) Nicolás Terol  (Aprilia) (3) Bradley Smith  (Aprilia)
Riders' championship standings (after 16 of 17 rounds): (1) Márquez 297 points (2) Terol 280 (3) Pol Espargaró  (Derbi) 261
Manufacturers' championship standings: (1) Derbi 385 points (2) Aprilia 323 (3) Honda 23

Rugby league
Four Nations: (teams in bold advance to the final)
Round two:  34–14  in Melbourne
Standings (after 2 matches): , Australia 4 points, England,  0.

Short track speed skating
World Cup 2 in Quebec City, Canada:
Men:
500 m:  François-Louis Tremblay   Liang Wenhao   François Hamelin 
Standings (after 2 events): (1) Tremblay 1512 points (2) Liang 1440 (3) Simon Cho  1010.
1000 m:  Charles Hamelin   Travis Jayner   Guillaume Bastille 
Standings (after 3 events): (1) Thibaut Fauconnet  2134 points (2) Anthony Lobello Jr.  1664 (3) Jayner 1440.
5000 m relay:      
Standings (after 2 events): (1) Canada 2000 points (2) United States 1440 (3) Italy 1050.
Women:
500 m:  Marianne St-Gelais   Arianna Fontana   Fan Kexin 
Standings (after 2 events): (1) St-Gelais 2000 points (2) Fontana 1600 (3) Valerie Lambert  968.
1000 m:  Zhou Yang   Katherine Reutter   Elise Christie 
Standings (after 3 events): (1) Reutter 1800 points (2) Marianne St-Gelais  1440 points (3) Lana Gehring  1328.
3000 m relay:      
Standings (after 2 events): (1) China 2000 points (2) Canada, United States 1440.

Snooker
Euro Players Tour Championship:
Event 4 in Gloucester:
Final: Stephen Lee  4–2 Stephen Maguire 
Lee wins his fifth professional title.
Order of Merit (after 10 of 12 events): (1) Mark Selby  19,400 (2) Barry Pinches  17,500 (3) Judd Trump  and Mark Williams  16,600

Tennis
WTA Tour Championships in Doha, Qatar, day 6:
Singles Final: Kim Clijsters  def. Caroline Wozniacki  6–3, 5–7, 6–3
Clijsters wins her third Tour Championships and the 40th title of her career.
Doubles Final: Gisela Dulko /Flavia Pennetta  def. Květa Peschke /Katarina Srebotnik  7–5, 6–4
Dulko wins her eighth title of the season and 16th of her career, while Pennetta wins her seventh title of the season and 13th of her career.
ATP World Tour:
St. Petersburg Open:
Final: Mikhail Kukushkin  def. Mikhail Youzhny  6–3, 7–6(2)
Kukushkin wins his first career title.
Bank Austria-TennisTrophy:
Final: Jürgen Melzer  def. Andreas Haider-Maurer  6–7(10), 7–6(4), 6–4
Melzer wins the third title of his career.
Open Sud de France:
Final: Gaël Monfils  def. Ivan Ljubičić  6–2, 5–7, 6–1
Monfils wins the third title of his career.

Volleyball
Women's World Championship in Japan: (teams in bold advance to the second round)
Pool A in Tokyo:
 1–3 
 3–0 
 0–3 
Standings (after 3 matches): Japan, Serbia 6 points, Poland, Peru, Costa Rica 4, Algeria 3.
Pool B in Hamamatsu:
 0–3 
 3–0 
 3–0 
Standings (after 3 matches): Brazil, Italy 6 points, Czech Republic, Netherlands, Puerto Rico 4, Kenya 3.
Pool C in Matsumoto:
 2–3 
 0–3 
 0–3 
Standings (after 3 matches): USA 6 points, Thailand, Germany 5, Cuba, Croatia 4, Kazakhstan 3.
Pool D in Osaka:
 3–2 
 0–3 
 3–0 
Standings (after 3 matches): Russia, South Korea 6 points, Turkey 5, China 4, Dominican Republic, Canada 3.

October 30, 2010 (Saturday)

American football
NCAA (unbeaten teams in bold):
BCS Top 10:
(1) Auburn 51, Mississippi 31
(2) Oregon 53, USC 32
(4) TCU 48, UNLV 6
(18) Iowa 37, (5) Michigan State 6
(14) Nebraska 31, (6) Missouri 17
(8) Utah 28, Air Force 23
(9) Oklahoma 43, Colorado 10
Played earlier this week: (3) Boise State
Idle: (7) Alabama, (10) Wisconsin
Other games: Virginia 24, (22) Miami 19

Baseball
World Series:
Game 3,  Texas Rangers 4, San Francisco Giants 2. Giants lead series 2–1.
Japan Series:
Game 1, Chiba Lotte Marines 5, Chunichi Dragons 2. Marines lead series 1–0.

Figure skating
ISU Grand Prix:
Skate Canada International in Kingston, Ontario:
Pairs:  Lubov Iliushechkina / Nodari Maisuradze  171.40  Kirsten Moore-Towers / Dylan Moscovitch  170.92  Paige Lawrence / Rudi Swiegers  161.15
Standings (after 2 of 6 events): Pang Qing / Tong Jian , Iliushechkina / Maisuradze 15 points (1 event), Vera Bazarova / Yuri Larionov , Moore-Towers / Moscovitch 13 (1), Lawrence / Swiegers, Narumi Takahashi / Mervin Tran  11 (1).
Men:  Patrick Chan  239.52  Nobunari Oda  236.52  Adam Rippon  233.04
Standings (after 2 of 6 events): Chan, Daisuke Takahashi  15 points (1 event), Oda, Jeremy Abbott  13 (1), Rippon, Florent Amodio  11 (1).
Ladies:  Alissa Czisny  172.37  Ksenia Makarova  165.00  Amélie Lacoste  157.26
Standings (after 2 of 6 events): Czisny, Carolina Kostner  15 points (1 event), Makarova, Rachael Flatt  13 (1), Lacoste, Kanako Murakami  11 (1).

Football (soccer)
CONCACAF Women's Gold Cup in Cancún, Mexico: (teams in bold advance to the semifinals)
Group B:
 0–3 
 9–0 
Standings (after 2 matches): United States, Costa Rica 6 points, Haiti, Guatemala 0.
CAF Confederation Cup Semi-finals, first leg:
CS Sfaxien  1–0  Al-Hilal
  MLS Cup Playoffs
Western Conference Semifinal, first leg in Frisco, Texas:
FC Dallas 2–1 Real Salt Lake
Eastern Conference Semifinal, first leg in Santa Clara, California:
San Jose Earthquakes 0–1 New York Red Bulls

Korfball
European Championship final round in Rotterdam, Netherlands:
15th–16th places:  16–12 
13th–14th places:  21–14 
11th–12th places: 10–11 
9th–10th places:  20–19 (g.g.)

Power Snooker
Power Snooker in London, England:
Third place: Ali Carter  299–102 Shaun Murphy 
Final: Ronnie O'Sullivan  572–258 Ding Junhui

Rugby league
Four Nations:
Round two:  76–12  in Rotorua
Standings: New Zealand 4 points (2 matches),  2 (1),  0 (1), Papua New Guinea 0 (2).

Rugby union
End of year tests:
Week 2:
 10–13  in Tokyo
 26–24  in Hong Kong
The Wallabies end a 10-match losing streak to the All Blacks, whose streak of Test wins ends at 15.
 6–32  in Moscow
 ITM Cup semifinal in Auckland:
Auckland 37–38 Waikato
 Currie Cup Final in Durban:
 30–10 Western Province
The Sharks win their sixth Currie Cup.

Short track speed skating
World Cup 2 in Quebec City, Canada:
Men:
1000 m:  Thibaut Fauconnet   Yu Yongjun   Anthony Lobello Jr. 
Standings (after 2 events): (1) Fauconnet 2000 points (2) Lobello 1152 (3) Yu, Michael Gilday  800.
1500 m:  Michael Gilday   Nicola Rodigari   Maxime Chataignier 
Standings (after 3 events): (1) Guillaume Bastille  1747 points (2) Chataignier 1280 (3) Jeff Simon  1210.
Women:
1000 m:  Lana Gehring   Arianna Fontana   Marianne St-Gelais 
Standings (after 2 events): (1) St-Gelais 1440 points (2) Liu Qiuhong  1050 (3) Gehring, Katherine Reutter  1000.
1500 m:  Zhou Yang   Katherine Reutter   Biba Sakurai 
Standings (after 3 events): (1) Zhou 2440 points (2) Reutter 1800 (3) Marie-Ève Drolet  1210.

Snowboarding
World Cup in London, United Kingdom:
Big Air:  Marko Grilc   Staale Sandbech   Seppe Smits

Tennis
WTA Tour Championships in Doha, Qatar, day 5:
Singles Semifinals:
Kim Clijsters  def. Samantha Stosur  7–6(3), 6–1
Caroline Wozniacki  def. Vera Zvonareva  7–5, 6–0
Doubles Semifinals:
Květa Peschke /Katarina Srebotnik  def. Lisa Raymond /Rennae Stubbs  7–6(6), 6–3
Gisela Dulko /Flavia Pennetta  def. Vania King /Yaroslava Shvedova  6–4, 6–4

Volleyball
Women's World Championship in Japan:
Pool A in Tokyo:
 3–0 
 3–1 
 3–1 
Standings (after 2 games): Serbia, Japan 4 points, Peru, Costa Rica 3, Poland, Algeria 2.
Pool B in Hamamatsu:
 2–3 
 0–3 
 2–3 
Standings (after 2 games): Brazil, Italy 4 points, Netherlands, Puerto Rico 3, Czech Republic, Kenya 2.
Pool C in Matsumoto:
 3–0 
 3–1 
 0–3 
Standings (after 2 games): Germany, USA 4 points, Thailand, Croatia 3, Cuba, Kazakhstan 2.
Pool D in Osaka:
 3–1 
 0–3 
 3–0 
Standings (after 2 games): Russia, South Korea 4 points, China, Turkey 3, Dominican Republic, Canada 2.

October 29, 2010 (Friday)

Cricket
Pakistan vs South Africa in UAE:
1st ODI in Abu Dhabi:  203 (49 overs);  207/2 (39.3 overs). South Africa win by 8 wickets; lead 5-match series 1–0.

Equestrianism
Dressage:
FEI World Cup Western European League:
2nd competition in Lyon (CSI-W):  Isabell Werth  on Warum Nicht FRH  Ulla Salzgeber  on Herzruf's Erbe  Valentina Truppa  on Chablis
Standings (after 2 of 10 competitions, including points from Central European League): (1) Werth 40 points (2) Catherine Haddad  39 (3) Salzgeber 37

Figure skating
ISU Grand Prix:
Skate Canada International in Kingston, Ontario:
Ladies Short Program: (1) Cynthia Phaneuf  58.24 (2) Ksenia Makarova  57.90 (3) Agnes Zawadzki  56.29
Pairs Short Program: (1) Lubov Iliushechkina / Nodari Maisuradze  60.72 (2) Marissa Castelli / Simon Shnapir  56.34 (3) Paige Lawrence / Rudi Swiegers  56.14
Men Short Program: (1) Nobunari Oda  81.37 (2) Kevin Reynolds  80.09 (3) Adam Rippon  77.53
Short Dance: (1) Sinead Kerr / John Kerr  62.96 (2) Vanessa Crone / Paul Poirier  62.95 (3) Pernelle Carron / Lloyd Jones  54.43

Football (soccer)
CONCACAF Women's Gold Cup in Cancún, Mexico:
Group A:
 0–1 
 7–2 
CAF Confederation Cup Semi-finals, first leg:
Ittihad  1–2  FUS Rabat
 League of Ireland Premier Division, matchday 36: (team in bold qualify for the 2011–12 UEFA Champions League, teams in italics qualify for the 2011–12 UEFA Europa League)
Bohemians 3–1 Dundalk
Bray 2–2 Shamrock Rovers
Final standings: Shamrock Rovers, Bohemians 67 points, Sligo Rovers 63, Sporting Fingal 62.
Shamrock Rovers win their 16th title and first in 16 years.

Korfball
European Championship final round in Rotterdam, Netherlands:
5th–8th places:
 15–19 
 17–15 
Semifinals:
 11–34 
 11–36

Rugby union
 ITM Cup semifinal in Christchurch:
Canterbury 57–41 Wellington

Tennis
WTA Tour Championships in Doha, Qatar, day 4: (players in bold advance to semifinals)
White Group:
Vera Zvonareva  def. Kim Clijsters  6–4, 7–5
Victoria Azarenka  def. Jelena Janković  6–4, 6–1
Final standings: Zvonareva 3–0, Clijsters 2–1, Azarenka 1–2, Janković 0–3.
Maroon Group:  Francesca Schiavone  def. Elena Dementieva  6–4, 6–2
Final standings: Samantha Stosur , Caroline Wozniacki  2–1, Schiavone, Dementieva 1–2.
After the match, Dementieva announces her retirement from professional tennis. (Eurosport)

Volleyball
Women's World Championship in Japan:
Pool A in Tokyo:
 3–0 
 3–0 
 2–3 
Pool B in Hamamatsu:
 3–0 
 0–3 
 0–3 
Pool C in Matsumoto:
 3–0 
 3–1 
 3–0 
Pool D in Osaka:
 3–1 
 0–3 
 3–1

October 28, 2010 (Thursday)

American football
NCAA BCS Top 25:
North Carolina State 28, (16) Florida State 24

Baseball
World Series:
Game 2: San Francisco Giants 9, Texas Rangers 0. Giants lead series 2–0.

Basketball
Euroleague, matchday 2:
Group A: Maccabi Tel Aviv  86–70  Žalgiris Kaunas
Group B: Real Madrid  68–56  Unicaja Málaga
Group C: KK Cibona Zagreb  68–73  Fenerbahçe Ülker
Group D:
Panathinaikos Athens  74–60  CSKA Moscow
Armani Jeans Milano  72–76  Union Olimpija Ljubljana

Football (soccer)
CONCACAF Women's Gold Cup in Cancún, Mexico:
Group B:
 1–0 
 5–0 
  MLS Cup Playoffs
Eastern Conference Semifinal, first leg in Commerce City, Colorado:
Colorado Rapids 1–0 Columbus Crew

Korfball
European Championship final round in Rotterdam, Netherlands:
13th–16th places:
 20–15 
 23–12 
9th–12th places:
 18–14 
 18–21

Snooker
Premier League Snooker – League phase in Penrith, Cumbria: (players in strike are eliminated)
Marco Fu  5–1 Ding Junhui 
Ronnie O'Sullivan  4–2 Mark Williams 
Standings: Fu 6 points (5 matches), Williams 5 (5), O'Sullivan 5 (4), Mark Selby  4 (4), Ding 4 (6), Neil Robertson , Shaun Murphy  3 (3).

Tennis
WTA Tour Championships in Doha, Qatar, day 3: (players in bold advance to semifinals)
White Group: Kim Clijsters  def. Victoria Azarenka  6–4, 5–7, 6–1
Standings: Vera Zvonareva , Clijsters 2–0, Azarenka, Jelena Janković  0–2.
Maroon Group:
Elena Dementieva  def. Samantha Stosur  4–6, 6–4, 7–6(4)
Caroline Wozniacki  def. Francesca Schiavone  3–6, 6–1, 6–1
Standings: Stosur, Wozniacki 2–1, Dementieva 1–1, Schiavone 0–2.

October 27, 2010 (Wednesday)

Baseball
World Series:
Game 1: San Francisco Giants 11, Texas Rangers 7. Giants lead series 1–0.

Basketball
Euroleague, matchday 2:
Group A:
Asseco Prokom Gdynia  73–80  Caja Laboral
Partizan Belgrade  72–68  Khimki Moscow
Group B:
Brose Baskets  73–61  Olympiacos Piraeus
Spirou Basket  55–64  Virtus Roma
Group C:
Lietuvos Rytas  75–79  Montepaschi Siena
Cholet Basket  77–84  Regal FC Barcelona
Group D: Efes Pilsen Istanbul  79–63  Power Electronics Valencia

Cricket
Pakistan vs South Africa in UAE:
2nd T20I in Abu Dhabi:  120/9 (20 overs);  125/4 (18.4 overs). South Africa win by 6 wickets; win 2-match series 2–0.

Football (soccer)
2011 FIFA Women's World Cup qualification (UEFA):
Repechage II, second leg (first leg score in parentheses):
 2–4 (0–1) . Italy win 5–2 on aggregate and advance to the UEFA-CONCACAF play-off.
Copa Sudamericana Quarterfinals, first leg:
Goiás  2–2  Avaí
Atlético Mineiro  1–1  Palmeiras

Korfball
European Championship second round in Rotterdam, Netherlands:
Quarterfinals: (teams in bold advance to semifinals)
Group E:
 15–11 
 39–12 
Final standings: Netherlands 9 points, Germany 6, Russia 3, England 0.
Group F:
 12–25 
 35–15 
Final standings: Belgium 9 points, Czech Republic 5, Portugal 3, Catalonia 1.
9th–16th classification: (teams in bold advance to 9th–12th classification)
Group G:
 14–13 
 13–15 
Final standings: Hungary 9 points, Ireland 5, Slovakia 4, Serbia 0.
Group H:
 17–12 
 12–15 
Final standings: Poland 9 points, Wales 6, Turkey 3, Scotland 0.

Tennis
WTA Tour Championships in Doha, Qatar, day 2:
White Group:
Vera Zvonareva  def. Victoria Azarenka  7–6(4), 6–4
Kim Clijsters  def. Jelena Janković  6–2, 6–3
Standings: Zvonareva 2–0, Clijsters 1–0, Azarenka 0–1, Janković 0–2.
Maroon Group: Samantha Stosur  def. Caroline Wozniacki  6–4, 6–3
Standings: Stosur 2–0, Wozniacki 1–1, Francesca Schiavone , Elena Dementieva  0–1.

October 26, 2010 (Tuesday)

American football
NCAA BCS Top 10 (unbeaten team in bold):
(3) Boise State 49, Louisiana Tech 20

Basketball
NBA season openers:
Boston Celtics 88, Miami Heat 80
Portland Trail Blazers 106, Phoenix Suns 92
Los Angeles Lakers 112, Houston Rockets 110

Cricket
Pakistan vs South Africa in UAE:
1st T20I in Abu Dhabi:  119 (19.5 overs);  120/4 (18.2 overs). South Africa win by 6 wickets; lead 2-match series 1–0.

Football (soccer)
Caribbean Championship Qualifying Group Stage Two: (teams in bold advance to the Final Tournament)
Group E in St. George's, Grenada:
 0–1 
 0–3 
Final standings: Guadeloupe 9 points, Grenada 6, Saint Kitts and Nevis 3, Puerto Rico 0.

Korfball
European Championship second round in Rotterdam, Netherlands:
Quarterfinals:
Group E:
 26–25 
 34–6 
Standings (after 2 games): Netherlands 6 points, Russia, Germany 3, England 0.
Group F:
 17–18 (g.g.) 
 32–16 
Standings (after 2 games): Belgium 6 points, Czech Republic 5, Catalonia 1, Portugal 0.
9th–16th classification:
Group G:
 17–8 
 10–16 
Standings (after 2 games): Hungary 6 points, Ireland 5, Slovakia 1, Serbia 0.
Group H:
 23–7 
 15–18 
Standings (after 2 games): Poland, Wales 6 points, Turkey, Scotland 0.

Tennis
WTA Tour Championships in Doha, Qatar, day 1:
White Group: Vera Zvonareva  def. Jelena Janković  6–3, 6–0
Maroon Group:
Caroline Wozniacki  def. Elena Dementieva  6–1, 6–1
Samantha Stosur  def. Francesca Schiavone  6–4, 6–4

October 25, 2010 (Monday)

American football
NFL, Week 7:
Monday Night Football: New York Giants 41, Dallas Cowboys 35

October 24, 2010 (Sunday)

Alpine skiing
Men's World Cup:
Giant slalom in Sölden, Austria: Cancelled after first run due to fog and wind.

American football
NFL, Week 7:
Carolina Panthers 23, San Francisco 49ers 20
Tampa Bay Buccaneers 18, St. Louis Rams 17
Baltimore Ravens 37, Buffalo Bills 34 (OT)
Cleveland Browns 30, New Orleans Saints 17
Pittsburgh Steelers 23, Miami Dolphins 22
Tennessee Titans 37, Philadelphia Eagles 19
Kansas City Chiefs 42, Jacksonville Jaguars 20
Washington Redskins 17, Chicago Bears 14
Atlanta Falcons 39, Cincinnati Bengals 32
Seattle Seahawks 22, Arizona Cardinals 10
New England Patriots 23, San Diego Chargers 20
Oakland Raiders 59, Denver Broncos 14
The Raiders tally a franchise record for most points in a game, with Darren McFadden scoring four touchdowns.
Sunday Night Football: Green Bay Packers 28, Minnesota Vikings 24
Byes: Detroit Lions, Indianapolis Colts, New York Jets, Houston Texans

Auto racing
Formula One:
 in Yeongam: (1) Fernando Alonso  (Ferrari) (2) Lewis Hamilton  (McLaren–Mercedes) (3) Felipe Massa  (Ferrari)
Drivers' championship standings (after 17 of 19 races): (1) Alonso 231 points (2) Mark Webber  (Red Bull–Renault) 220 (3) Hamilton 210
Constructors' championship standings: (1) Red Bull 426 points (2) McLaren 399 (3) Ferrari 374
Chase for the Sprint Cup:
TUMS Fast Relief 500 in Martinsville: (1)  Denny Hamlin (Toyota; Joe Gibbs Racing) (2)  Mark Martin (Chevrolet; Hendrick Motorsports) (3)  Kevin Harvick (Chevrolet; Richard Childress Racing)
Drivers' championship standings (after 32 of 36 races): (1)  Jimmie Johnson (Chevrolet; Hendrick Motorsports) 5998 points (2) Hamlin 5992 (3) Harvick 5936
V8 Supercars:
Armor All Gold Coast 600 in Surfers Paradise, Queensland: (1) Jamie Whincup /Steve Owen  (Holden Commodore) (2) Shane van Gisbergen /John McIntyre  (Ford Falcon) (3) Mark Winterbottom /Luke Youlden  (Ford Falcon)
Drivers' championship standings (after 20 of 26 races): (1) James Courtney  (Ford Falcon) 2521 points (2) Whincup 2450 (3) Craig Lowndes  (Holden Commodore) 2255
World Rally Championship:
Rally Catalunya in Salou: (1) Sébastien Loeb /Daniel Elena  (Citroën C4 WRC) (2) Petter Solberg /Chris Patterson  (Citroën C4 WRC) (3) Dani Sordo /Diego Vallejo  (Citroën C4 WRC)
Drivers' championship standings (after 12 of 13 rounds): (1) Loeb 251 points (2) Sébastien Ogier  (Citroën C4 WRC) 167 (3) Jari-Matti Latvala  (Ford Focus RS WRC 09) 156

Cricket
Australia in India:
3rd ODI in Margao:  vs. . Match abandoned without a ball bowled; India win 3-match series 1–0.

Equestrianism
Show jumping:
FEI World Cup Western European League:
2nd competition in Helsinki (CSI 5*-W):  Christian Ahlmann  on Taloubet Z  Philipp Weishaupt  on Catoki  Leon Thijssen  on Tyson
Standings (after 2 of 13 competitions): (1) Ahlmann 40 points (2) Thijssen 27 (3) Weishaupt 24
Dressage:
FEI World Cup Western European League:
1st competition in Odense (CSI-W):  Isabell Werth  on Satchmo  Nathalie zu Sayn-Wittgenstein-Berleburg  on Digby  Hans Peter Minderhoud  on Tango

Figure skating
ISU Grand Prix:
NHK Trophy in Nagoya, Japan:
Men:  Daisuke Takahashi  234.79  Jeremy Abbott  218.19  Florent Amodio  213.77

Football (soccer)
Caribbean Championship Qualifying Group Stage Two: (teams in bold advance for the Final Tournament)
Group E in St. George's, Grenada:
 3–2 
 2–0 
Standings (after 2 matches): Grenada, Guadeloupe 6 points, Puerto Rico, Saint Kitts and Nevis 0.
OFC Champions League Group stage, matchday 1:
Group B: Waitakere United  3–1  AS Tefana

Futsal
Grand Prix de Futsal in Anápolis, Brazil:
Final:   2–1  
Spain win the title for the first time and stop Brazil's winning streak at five.

Golf
PGA Tour Fall Series:
Justin Timberlake Shriners Hospitals for Children Open in Las Vegas, Nevada:
Winner: Jonathan Byrd  263 (−21)PO
Byrd wins his fourth PGA Tour title with a hole in one on the fourth playoff hole, defeating  Martin Laird  and Cameron Percy .
European Tour:
Castelló Masters Costa Azahar in Castellón, Spain:
Winner: Matteo Manassero  268 (−16)
LPGA Tour:
Sime Darby LPGA Malaysia in Kuala Lumpur, Malaysia:
Winner: Jimin Kang  204 (−9)
Kang wins her second LPGA Tour title.
Champions Tour:
Administaff Small Business Classic in The Woodlands, Texas:
Winner: Fred Couples  199 (−17)
Couples wins for the fourth time in his first Champions Tour season.

Gymnastics
World Artistic Gymnastics Championships in Rotterdam, Netherlands:
Men's:
Vault:  Thomas Bouhail  16.449 points  Anton Golotsutskov  16.366  Dzmitry Kaspiarovich  16.316
Parallel bars:  Feng Zhe  15.966 points  Teng Haibin  15.616  Kōhei Uchimura  15.500
Horizontal bar:  Zhang Chenglong  16.166 points  Epke Zonderland  16.033  Fabian Hambüchen  15.966
Women's:
Balance beam:  Ana Porgras  15.366 points  Rebecca Bross  15.233  Deng Linlin  15.233
Floor:  Lauren Mitchell  14.833 points  Aliya Mustafina  14.766  Diana Chelaru  14.766

Korfball
European Championship first round in the Netherlands, matchday 3: (teams in bold advance to second round)
Group A in Leeuwarden:
 21–11 
 45–8 
Final standings: Netherlands 9 points, Germany 6, Hungary 3, Serbia 0.
Group B in Tilburg:
 23–5 
 35–9 
Final standings: Belgium 9 points, Catalonia 6, Poland 3, Scotland 0.
Group C in Almelo:
 17–13 
 20–17 
Final standings: Czech Republic 9 points, Portugal 6, Wales 3, Turkey 0.
Group D in The Hague:
 13–14 (g.g.) 
 26–24 
Final standings: Russia 9 points, England 6, Ireland 2, Slovakia 1.

Rugby league
Four Nations:
Round one:  42–0  in Sydney

Short track speed skating
World Cup in Montreal, Canada:
Men:
500 m:  Charles Hamelin   Simon Cho   Liang Wenhao 
1500 m:  Guillaume Bastille   Travis Jayner   Maxime Chataignier 
Standings (after 2 events): Bastille 1640 points, Jeff Simon  1000, Jayner, Simon Cho  800.
5000 m relay:      
Women:
500 m:  Marianne St-Gelais   Arianna Fontana   Valerie Lambert 
1500 m:  Katherine Reutter   Marie-Ève Drolet   Zhou Yang 
Standings (after 2 events): Zhou 1440 points, Reutter, Lana Gehring  1000.
3000 m relay:

Snooker
Euro Players Tour Championship:
Event 3 in Rüsselsheim, Germany:
Final: Marcus Campbell  4–0 Liang Wenbo 
Campbell wins his first professional title.
Order of Merit (after 9 of 12 events): (1) Mark Selby  18,400 (2) Barry Pinches  17,500 (3) Mark Williams  16,600

Tennis
ATP World Tour:
If Stockholm Open:
Final: Roger Federer  def. Florian Mayer  6–4, 6–3
Federer wins his third title of the year and the 64th of his career.
Kremlin Cup:
Final: Viktor Troicki  def. Marcos Baghdatis  3–6, 6–4, 6–3
Troicki wins the first title of his career.
WTA Tour:
Kremlin Cup:
Final: Victoria Azarenka  def. Maria Kirilenko  6–3, 6–4
Azarenka wins her second title of the year and the fifth of her career.
BGL Luxembourg Open:
Final: Roberta Vinci  def. Julia Görges  6–3, 6–4
Vinci wins the third title of her career.

October 23, 2010 (Saturday)

Alpine skiing
Women's World Cup:
Giant slalom in Sölden, Austria:  Viktoria Rebensburg  2:26.39  Kathrin Hölzl  2:26.81  Manuela Mölgg  2:27.25

American football
NCAA (unbeaten teams in bold):
BCS Top 10:
(11) Missouri 36, (1) Oklahoma 27
(4) Auburn 24, (6) LSU 17
(5) TCU 38, Air Force 7
(7) Michigan State 35, Northwestern 27
"Third Saturday in October": (8) Alabama 41, Tennessee 10
(9) Utah 59, Colorado State 6
(10) Ohio State 49, Purdue 0
Played earlier this week: (2) Oregon
Idle: (3) Boise State
Other games:
(13) Wisconsin 31, (15) Iowa 30
(16) Nebraska 51, (14) Oklahoma State 41
Iowa State 28, (19) Texas 21
Syracuse 19, (20) West Virginia 14

Auto racing
Nationwide Series:
5-Hour Energy 250 in Madison, Illinois: (1)  Brad Keselowski (Dodge; Penske Racing) (2)  Mike Bliss (Chevrolet; Kevin Harvick Inc.) (3)  Justin Allgaier (Dodge; Penske Racing)
Drivers' championship standings (after 32 of 35 races): (1) Keselowski 5144 points (2)  Carl Edwards (Ford; Roush Fenway Racing) 4659 (3)  Kyle Busch (Toyota; Joe Gibbs Racing) 4439
V8 Supercars:
Armor All Gold Coast 600 in Surfers Paradise, Queensland: (1) Garth Tander /Cameron McConville  (Holden Commodore) (2) Craig Lowndes /Andy Priaulx  (Holden Commodore) (3) Shane van Gisbergen /John McIntyre  (Ford Falcon)
Drivers' championship standings (after 19 of 26 races): (1) James Courtney  (Ford Falcon) 2401 points (2) Jamie Whincup  (Holden Commodore) 2300 (3) Lowndes 2177

Baseball
Major League Baseball postseason:
National League Championship Series:
Game 6, San Francisco Giants 3, Philadelphia Phillies 2. Giants win series 4–2.
The Giants win their first pennant since 2002. Cody Ross of the Giants is named series MVP.
Nippon Professional Baseball Climax Series:
Central League Final Stage:
Game 4, Chunichi Dragons 4, Yomiuri Giants 3. Dragons win series 4–1.

Figure skating
ISU Grand Prix:
NHK Trophy in Nagoya, Japan:
Men's Short Program: (1) Daisuke Takahashi  78.04 (2) Jeremy Abbott  74.62 (3) Shawn Sawyer  70.15
Ice Dance:  Meryl Davis / Charlie White  165.21  Kaitlyn Weaver / Andrew Poje  141.57  Maia Shibutani / Alex Shibutani  136.93
Pairs:  Pang Qing / Tong Jian  189.37  Vera Bazarova / Yuri Larionov  173.83  Narumi Takahashi / Mervin Tran  155.66
Ladies:  Carolina Kostner  164.61  Rachael Flatt  161.04  Kanako Murakami  150.16

Football (soccer)
2011 FIFA Women's World Cup qualification (UEFA):
Repechage II, first leg:
 1–0 
OFC Champions League Group stage, matchday 1:
Group A:
Koloale  1–2  Lautoka
PRK Hekari United  1–2  Amical
Group B: Auckland City FC  3–0  AS Magenta

Futsal
Grand Prix de Futsal in Anápolis, Brazil:
15th place match:  6–3 
13th place match:  3–1 
11th place match:  1–3 
9th place match:  0–2 
7th place match:  1–2 
5th place match:  0–3 
3rd place match:  3–5 (a.e.t.)

Gymnastics
World Artistic Gymnastics Championships in Rotterdam, Netherlands:
Men's:
Floor:  Eleftherios Kosmidis  15.700 points  Kōhei Uchimura  15.533  Daniel Purvis  15.366
Pommel horse:  Krisztián Berki  15.833 points  Louis Smith  15.733  Prashanth Sellathurai  15.566
Rings:  Chen Yibing  15.900 points  Yan Mingyong  15.700  Matteo Morandi  15.666
Women's:
Vault:  Alicia Sacramone  15.200 points  Aliya Mustafina  15.066  Jade Barbosa  14.799
Uneven bars:  Beth Tweddle  15.733 points  Aliya Mustafina  15.600  Rebecca Bross  15.066

Horse racing
Cox Plate in Melbourne:  So You Think (trainer: Bart Cummings; jockey: Steven Arnold)  Zipping (trainer: Robert Hickmott; jockey: Nicholas Hall)  Whobegotyou (trainer: Mark Kavanagh; jockey: Michael Rodd)
So You Think becomes the first horse since Northerly (2001–02) to win two successive Cox Plates.

Korfball
European Championship first round in the Netherlands, matchday 2:
Group A in Leeuwarden:
 36–13 
 41–8 
Standings (after 2 games): Netherlands 6 points, Hungary, Germany 3, Serbia 0.
Group B in Tilburg:
 16–11 
 29–12 
Standings (after 2 games): Belgium 6 points, Catalonia, Poland 3, Scotland 0.
Group C in Almelo:
 30–9 
 33–9 
Standings (after 2 games): Czech Republic, Portugal 6 points, Turkey, Wales 0.
Group D in The Hague:
 27–6 
 16–12 
Standings (after 2 games): England, Russia 6 points, Ireland, Slovakia 0.

Mixed martial arts
UFC 121 in Anaheim, California
Heavyweight bout: Brendan Schaub  def. Gabriel Gonzaga  by unanimous decision (30–27, 30–27, 30–27)
Light heavyweight bout: Matt Hamill  def. Tito Ortiz  by unanimous decision (29–28, 29–28, 30–27)
Welterweight bout: Diego Sanchez  def. Paulo Thiago  by unanimous decision (30–26, 29–28, 29–28)
Welterweight bout: Jake Shields  def. Martin Kampmann  by split decision (29–28 Shields, 29–28 Kampmann, 29–28 Shields)
Heavyweight Championship bout: Cain Velasquez  def. Brock Lesnar (c)  by TKO (punches)

Rugby league
Four Nations:
Round 1:  24–10  in Wellington
European Cup:
 11–12 
Standings: Wales 6 points (3 matches), France 4 (3),  0 (2).
Wales win the title and qualify for 2011 Four Nations.

Rugby union
End of year tests:
Week 1:  20–40  in Moscow

Short track speed skating
World Cup in Montreal, Canada:
Men:
1000 m:  Thibaut Fauconnet   Michael Gilday   Travis Jayner 
1500 m:  Jeff Simon   Simon Cho   Guillaume Bastille 
Women:
1000 m:  Katherine Reutter   Marianne St-Gelais   Liu Qiuhong 
1500 m:  Lana Gehring   Zhou Yang   Valérie Maltais

October 22, 2010 (Friday)

Baseball
Major League Baseball postseason:
American League Championship Series:
Game 6, Texas Rangers 6, New York Yankees 1. Rangers win series 4–2.
The Rangers win their first pennant ever. The Rangers' Josh Hamilton is named series MVP.
Nippon Professional Baseball Climax Series:
Central League Final Stage:
Game 3, Yomiuri Giants 3, Chunichi Dragons 2. Dragons lead series 3–1.

Cricket
Zimbabwe in South Africa:
3rd ODI in Benoni:  399/6 (50 overs; JP Duminy 129, AB de Villiers 109);  127 (29 overs). South Africa win by 272 runs; win 3-match series 3–0.

Figure skating
ISU Grand Prix:
NHK Trophy in Nagoya, Japan:
Short Dance: (1) Meryl Davis / Charlie White  66.97 (2) Kaitlyn Weaver / Andrew Poje   58.69 (3) Elena Ilinykh / Nikita Katsalapov  56.89
Pairs Short Program: (1) Pang Qing / Tong Jian  67.10 (2) Vera Bazarova / Yuri Larionov  60.16 (3) Narumi Takahashi / Mervin Tran  57.23
Ladies' Short Program: (1) Carolina Kostner  57.27 (2) Kanako Murakami  56.10 (3) Rachael Flatt  53.69

Football (soccer)
Caribbean Championship Qualifying Group Stage Two:
Group E in St. George's, Grenada:
 1–2 
 3–1

Futsal
Grand Prix de Futsal in Anápolis, Brazil:
13th–16th playoffs:
 2–8 
 4–1 
9th–12th playoffs:
 5–2 
 4–7 
5th–8th playoffs:
 1–2 
 2–4 
Semifinals:
 4–6 
 3–5

Gymnastics
World Artistic Gymnastics Championships in Rotterdam, Netherlands:
Men's Individual all-around:  Kōhei Uchimura  92.331 points  Philipp Boy  90.048  Jonathan Horton  89.864
Uchimura wins the all-around title for the second straight time.
Women's Individual all-around:  Aliya Mustafina  61.032 points  Jiang Yuyuan  59.998  Rebecca Bross  58.996
Mustafina wins her first individual world title.

Korfball
European Championship first round in the Netherlands, matchday 1:
Group A in Leeuwarden:
 22–16 
 36–8 
Group B in Tilburg:
 35–7 
 38–10 
Group C in Almelo:
 20–9 
 32–7 
Group D in The Hague:
 24–6 
 23–14

Snooker
Players Tour Championship:
Euro Event 3:
Thanawat Thirapongpaiboon becomes the youngest player ever to make an official maximum break at the age of 16 years and 312 days.

October 21, 2010 (Thursday)

American football
NCAA BCS Top 10 (unbeaten team in bold):
(2) Oregon 60, UCLA 13

Baseball
Major League Baseball postseason:
National League Championship Series:
Game 5, Philadelphia Phillies 4, San Francisco Giants 2. Giants lead series 3–2.
Nippon Professional Baseball Climax Series:
Central League Final Stage:
Game 2, Chunichi Dragons 2, Yomiuri Giants 0. Dragons lead series 3–0.

Basketball
Euroleague:
Regular Season, matchday 1:
Group A:
Žalgiris Kaunas  73–62  Partizan Belgrade
Caja Laboral  94–78  Maccabi Tel Aviv
Group B: Unicaja Málaga  84–73  Spirou Basket
Group C:
Regal FC Barcelona  80–66  KK Cibona Zagreb
Montepaschi Siena  76–44  Cholet Basket
Group D:
CSKA Moscow  73–88  Armani Jeans Milano
Power Electronics Valencia  56–72  Panathinaikos Athens

Football (soccer)
UEFA Europa League group stage, matchday 3:
Group A:
Manchester City  3–1  Lech Poznań
Red Bull Salzburg  1–1  Juventus
Standings (after 3 matches): Manchester City 7 points, Lech Poznań 4, Juventus 3, Red Bull Salzburg 1.
Group B:
Atlético Madrid  3–0  Rosenborg
Aris  0–0  Bayer Leverkusen
Standings (after 3 matches): Bayer Leverkusen 5 points, Aris, Atlético Madrid 4, Rosenborg 3.
Group C:
Sporting CP  5–1  Gent
Lille  1–0  Levski Sofia
Standings (after 3 matches): Sporting CP 9 points, Lille 4, Levski Sofia 3, Gent 1.
Group D:
Villarreal  1–0  PAOK
Dinamo Zagreb  0–0  Club Brugge
Standings (after 3 matches): Villarreal 6 points, PAOK, Dinamo Zagreb 4, Club Brugge 2.
Group E:
Sheriff Tiraspol  0–1  BATE
AZ  1–2  Dynamo Kyiv
Standings (after 3 matches): BATE 7 points, Dynamo Kyiv 4, AZ, Sheriff Tiraspol 3.
Group F:
Palermo  0–3  CSKA Moscow
Sparta Prague  3–3  Lausanne-Sport
Standings (after 3 matches): CSKA Moscow 9 points, Sparta Prague 4, Palermo 3, Lausanne-Sport 1.
Group G:
Zenit St. Petersburg  2–0  Hajduk Split
Anderlecht  3–0  AEK Athens
Standings (after 3 matches): Zenit St. Petersburg 9 points, Anderlecht, Hajduk Split, AEK Athens 3.
Group H:
Young Boys  4–2  Odense
Stuttgart  1–0  Getafe
Standings (after 3 matches): Stuttgart 9 points, Young Boys 6, Getafe 3, Odense 0.
Group I:
Metalist Kharkiv  2–1  Sampdoria
Debrecen  1–2  PSV Eindhoven
Standings (after 3 matches): PSV Eindhoven 7 points, Metalist Kharkiv 6, Sampdoria 4, Debrecen 0.
Group J:
Borussia Dortmund  1–1  Paris Saint-Germain
Karpaty Lviv  0–1  Sevilla
Standings (after 3 matches): Paris Saint-Germain 7 points, Sevilla 6, Borussia Dortmund 4, Karpaty Lviv 0.
Group K:
Utrecht  1–1  Steaua București
Napoli  0–0  Liverpool
Standings (after 3 matches): Liverpool 5 points, Napoli, Utrecht 3, Steaua București 2.
Group L:
CSKA Sofia  0–2  Rapid Wien
Beşiktaş  1–3  Porto
Standings (after 3 matches): Porto 9 points, Beşiktaş 6, Rapid Wien 3, CSKA Sofia 0.
CONCACAF Champions League Group Stage, matchday 6: (teams in bold advance to the quarterfinals)
Group B: Joe Public  1–4  Columbus Crew
Final standings:  Santos Laguna 13 points, Columbus Crew 12,  Municipal 8, Joe Public 1.
Copa Sudamericana Round of 16, second leg (first leg score in parentheses):
San José  2–0 (0–6)  Newell's Old Boys. 3–3 on points; Newell's Old Boys win 6–2 on aggregate.
Avaí  3–1 (1–2)  Emelec. 3–3 on points; Avaí win 4–3 on aggregate.

Futsal
Grand Prix de Futsal in Anápolis, Brazil:
9th–16th playoffs:
 1–0 
 2–4 
 2–3 
 9–2 
Quarterfinals:
 2–0 (a.e.t.) 
 3–1 
 7–2 
 6–1

Gymnastics
World Artistic Gymnastics Championships in Rotterdam, Netherlands:
Men's Team all-around:   274.997 points   273.769   271.252
China win the men's team title for the fourth straight time and ninth overall.

Snooker
Premier League Snooker – League phase in Banbury:
Neil Robertson  6–0 Ding Junhui 
Marco Fu  3–3 Mark Williams 
Standings: Williams 5 points (4 matches), Mark Selby , Fu 4 (4), Ding 4 (5), Robertson, Shaun Murphy , Ronnie O'Sullivan  3 (3).

October 20, 2010 (Wednesday)

Baseball
Major League Baseball postseason:
American League Championship Series:
Game 5, New York Yankees 7, Texas Rangers 2. Rangers lead series 3–2.
National League Championship Series:
Game 4, San Francisco Giants 6, Philadelphia Phillies 5. Giants lead series 3–1.
Nippon Professional Baseball Climax Series:
Central League Final Stage:
Game 1, Chunichi Dragons 5, Yomiuri Giants 0. Dragons lead series 2–0.

Basketball
Euroleague:
Regular Season, matchday 1:
Group A: Khimki Moscow  82–76  Asseco Prokom Gdynia
Group B: Virtus Roma  83–65  Brose Baskets
Group C: Fenerbahçe Ülker  86–69  Lietuvos Rytas
Group D: Union Olimpija Ljubljana  95–90 (2OT)  Efes Pilsen Istanbul

Cricket
Australia in India:
2nd ODI in Visakhapatnam:  289/3 (50 overs; Michael Clarke 111*);  292/5 (48.5 overs; Virat Kohli 118). India win by 5 wickets; lead 3-match series 1–0.

Football (soccer)
UEFA Champions League group stage, matchday 3:
Group A:
Internazionale  4–3  Tottenham
Twente  1–1  Werder Bremen
Standings (after 3 matches): Internazionale 7 points, Tottenham Hotspur 4, Twente, Werder Bremen 2.
Group B:
Schalke 04  3–1  Hapoel Tel Aviv
Raúl scores twice to become the leading scorer in European club competitions with 70 goals.
Lyon  2–0  Benfica
Standings (after 3 matches): Lyon 9 points, Schalke 04 6, Benfica 3, Hapoel Tel Aviv 0.
Group C:
Rangers  1–1  Valencia
Manchester United  1–0  Bursaspor
Standings (after 3 matches): Manchester United 7 points, Rangers 5, Valencia 4, Bursaspor 0.
Group D:
Panathinaikos  0–0  Rubin Kazan
Barcelona  2–0  Copenhagen
Standings (after 3 matches): Barcelona 7 points, Copenhagen 6, Rubin Kazan 2, Panathinaikos 1.
AFC Champions League Semi-finals, second leg: (first leg score in parentheses):
Seongnam Ilhwa Chunma  1–0 (3–4)  Al-Shabab. 4–4 on aggregate; Seongnam Ilhwa Chunma win on away goals rule.
Al-Hilal  0–1 (0–1)  Zob Ahan. Zob Ahan win 2–0 on aggregate.
CONCACAF Champions League Group Stage, matchday 6: (teams in bold advance to the quarterfinals)
Group C: Marathón  0–1  Monterrey
Final standings: Monterrey 16 points,  Saprissa 10, Marathón 6,  Seattle Sounders FC 3.
Group D:
Toluca  5–0  FAS
Olimpia  3–0  Puerto Rico Islanders
Final standings: Olimpia 13 points, Toluca 10, Puerto Rico Islanders 8, FAS 2.
Copa Sudamericana Round of 16, second leg (first leg score in parentheses):
Peñarol  3–2 (0–1)  Goiás. 3–3 on points, 3–3 on aggregate; Goiás win on away goals rule.
Palmeiras  3–1 (1–0)  Universitario. Palmeiras win 6–0 on points.
Santa Fe  1–0 (0–2)  Atlético Mineiro. 3–3 on points; Atlético Mineiro win 2–1 on aggregate.

Gymnastics
World Artistic Gymnastics Championships in Rotterdam, Netherlands:
Women's Team all-around:   175.397 points   175.196   174.781
Russia win the women's team title for the first time as a separate team (since the break-up of Soviet Union).

October 19, 2010 (Tuesday)

Baseball
Major League Baseball postseason:
American League Championship Series:
Game 4, Texas Rangers 10, New York Yankees 3. Rangers lead series 3–1.
National League Championship Series:
Game 3, San Francisco Giants 3, Philadelphia Phillies 0. Giants lead series 2–1.
Nippon Professional Baseball Climax Series:
Pacific League Final Stage:
Game 6, Chiba Lotte Marines 7, Fukuoka SoftBank Hawks 0. Marines win series 4–3.

Football (soccer)
UEFA Champions League group stage, matchday 3:
Group E:
Roma  1–3  Basel
Bayern Munich  3–2  CFR Cluj
Standings (after 3 matches): Bayern Munich 9 points, Basel, CFR Cluj, Roma 3.
Group F:
Spartak Moscow  0–2  Chelsea
Marseille  1–0  Žilina
Standings (after 3 matches): Chelsea 9 points, Spartak Moscow 6, Marseille 3, Žilina 0.
Group G:
Ajax  2–1  Auxerre
Real Madrid  2–0  Milan
Standings (after 3 matches): Real Madrid 9 points, Milan, Ajax 4, Auxerre 0.
Group H:
Braga  2–0  Partizan
Arsenal  5–1  Shakhtar Donetsk
Standings (after 3 matches): Arsenal 9 points, Shakhtar Donetsk 6, Braga 3, Partizan 0.
AFC Cup Semi-finals, second leg (first leg score in parentheses):
Al-Qadsia  4–1 (0–2)  Al-Riffa. Al-Qadsia win 4–3 on aggregate.
Al-Ittihad  2–0 (0–1)  Muangthong United. Al-Ittihad win 2–1 on aggregate.
CONCACAF Champions League Group Stage, matchday 6: (teams in bold advance to the quarterfinals)
Group A:
Toronto FC  1–0  Árabe Unido
Real Salt Lake  3–1  Cruz Azul
Final standings: Real Salt Lake 13 points, Cruz Azul 10, Toronto FC 8, Árabe Unido 3.
Group B: Santos Laguna  6–1  Municipal
Standings: Santos Laguna 13 points (6 matches),  Columbus Crew 9 (5), Municipal 8 (6),  Joe Public 1 (5).
Group C: Seattle Sounders FC  1–2  Saprissa
Standings:  Monterrey 13 points (5 matches), Saprissa 10 (6),  Marathón 6 (5), Seattle Sounders FC 3 (6).
Copa Sudamericana Round of 16, second leg (first leg score in parentheses):
Independiente  4–2 (0–1)  Defensor Sporting. 3–3 on points; Independiente win 4–3 on aggregate.
LDU Quito  6–1 (2–4)  Unión San Felipe. 3–3 on points; LDU Quito win 8–5 on aggregate.

Futsal
Grand Prix de Futsal in Anápolis, Brazil: (teams in bold advance to the quarterfinals)
Group A:
 2–1 
 7–2 
Final standings: Brazil 9 points, Czech Republic 4, Libya 2, Costa Rica 1.
Group B:
 7–1 
 1–5 
Final standings: Spain 9 points, Argentina, Romania 4, Qatar 0.
Group C:
 1–2 
 1–7 
Final standings: Paraguay 9 points, Italy 6, Netherlands 3, Zambia 0.
Group D:
 7–0 
 5–3 
Final standings: Iran 7 points, Portugal 6, Russia 4, Guatemala 0.

October 18, 2010 (Monday)

American football
NFL, Week 6:
Monday Night Football: Tennessee Titans 30, Jacksonville Jaguars 3

Baseball
Major League Baseball postseason:
American League Championship Series:
Game 3, Texas Rangers 8, New York Yankees 0. Rangers lead series 2–1.
Nippon Professional Baseball Climax Series:
Pacific League Final Stage:
Game 5, Chiba Lotte Marines 5, Fukuoka SoftBank Hawks 2. Series tied 3–3.

Basketball
Euroleague:
Regular Season, matchday 1:
Group B: Olympiacos Piraeus  82–66  Real Madrid

Futsal
Grand Prix de Futsal in Anápolis, Brazil: (teams in bold advance to the quarterfinals)
Group A:
 2–2 
 0–8 
Standings (after 2 matches): Brazil 6 points, Libya 2, Czech Republic, Costa Rica 1.
Group B:
 2–4 
 4–1 
Standings (after 2 matches): Spain 6 points, Romania 4, Argentina 1, Qatar 0.
Group C:
 1–3 
 6–0 
Standings (after 2 matches): Paraguay, Italy 6 points, Netherlands, Zambia 0.
Group D:
 2–1 
 1–6 
Standings (after 2 matches): Portugal 6 points, Iran 4, Russia 1, Guatemala 0.

October 17, 2010 (Sunday)

American football
NFL, Week 6:
New York Giants 28, Detroit Lions 20
Philadelphia Eagles 31, Atlanta Falcons 17
Pittsburgh Steelers 28, Cleveland Browns 10
Houston Texans 35, Kansas City Chiefs 31
New Orleans Saints 31, Tampa Bay Buccaneers 6
Miami Dolphins 23, Green Bay Packers 20 (OT)
St. Louis Rams 20, San Diego Chargers 17
New England Patriots 23, Baltimore Ravens 20 (OT)
Seattle Seahawks 23, Chicago Bears 20
New York Jets 24, Denver Broncos 20
San Francisco 49ers 17, Oakland Raiders 9
Minnesota Vikings 24, Dallas Cowboys 21
Sunday Night Football: Indianapolis Colts 27, Washington Redskins 24
Byes: Arizona Cardinals, Buffalo Bills, Carolina Panthers, Cincinnati Bengals
NCAA:
The first BCS standings of the season are released, with Oklahoma as #1.
Oregon is the new #1 in the AP Poll for the first time ever. The last team to be #1 for the first time in the AP Poll was Virginia in 1990.

Baseball
Major League Baseball postseason:
National League Championship Series:
Game 2, Philadelphia Phillies 6, San Francisco Giants 1. Series tied 1–1.
Nippon Professional Baseball Climax Series:
Pacific League Final Stage:
Game 4, Chiba Lotte Marines 4, Fukuoka SoftBank Hawks 2. Hawks lead series 3–2.
Central League First Stage:
Game 2, Yomiuri Giants 7, Hanshin Tigers 6. Giants win series 2–0.

Cricket
Australia in India:
1st ODI in Kochi:  vs. . Match abandoned without a ball bowled.
New Zealand in Bangladesh:
5th ODI in Mirpur:  174 (44.2 overs);  171 (49.3 overs). Bangladesh win by 3 runs; win 5-match series 4–0.
Zimbabwe in South Africa:
2nd ODI in Potchefstroom:  268 (48.2 overs; Rusty Theron 5/44);  273/2 (39 overs; Hashim Amla 110, AB de Villiers 101*). South Africa win by 8 wickets; lead 3-match series 2–0.

Equestrianism
Show jumping:
FEI World Cup Western European League:
1st competition in Oslo (CSI 5*-W):  Christian Ahlmann  on Taloubet Z   Ludger Beerbaum  on Chaman   Lars Nieberg  on Levito

Football (soccer)
Caribbean Championship Qualifying Group Stage One: (teams in bold advance to Qualifying Group Stage Two)
Group C in Paramaribo, Suriname:
 2–2 
 0–2 
Final standings: Guyana 9 points, Suriname 6 points, Saint Lucia, Netherlands Antilles 1.
Group D in San Cristóbal, Dominican Republic:  0–1 
Final standings: Dominica 6 points, Dominican Republic 3,  0.
CAF Champions League semifinals, second leg: (first leg score in parentheses)
Espérance ST  1–0 (1–2)  Al-Ahly. 2–2 on aggregate; Espérance ST win on away goals rule.
CAF Confederation Cup group stage, matchday 6 (teams in bold advance to the semifinals):
Group B:
FUS Rabat  2–1  CS Sfaxien
Haras El Hodood  1–1  Zanaco
Final standings: FUS Rabat 13 points, CS Sfaxien 10, Zanaco 6, Haras El Hodood 3.
Copa Libertadores de Fútbol Femenino in Barueri, São Paulo, Brazil:
3rd place playoff: Deportivo Quito  1–2   Boca Juniors
Final:  Everton  0–1   Santos
Santos win the title for the second straight time.

Futsal
Grand Prix de Futsal in Anápolis, Brazil:
Group A:
 9–2 
 3–3 
Group B:
 13–0 
 2–2 
Group C:
 2–0 
 1–5 
Group D:
 2–2 
 2–0

Golf
PGA Tour Fall Series:
Frys.com Open in San Martin, California:
Winner: Rocco Mediate  269 (−15)
Mediate wins his sixth PGA Tour title, and first in eight years.
European Tour:
Portugal Masters in Vilamoura, Portugal:
Winner: Richard Green  270 (−18)
Green wins his third European Tour title.
LPGA Tour:
CVS/pharmacy LPGA Challenge in Danville, California:
Winner: Beatriz Recari  274 (−14)
Recari wins her first LPGA Tour title.

Motorcycle racing
Moto GP:
Australian Grand Prix in Phillip Island:
MotoGP: (1) Casey Stoner  (Ducati) (2) Jorge Lorenzo  (Yamaha) (3) Valentino Rossi  (Yamaha)
Riders' championship standings (after 16 of 18 rounds): (1) Lorenzo 333 points (2) Dani Pedrosa  (Honda) 228 (3) Stoner 205
Manufacturers' championship standings: (1) Yamaha 354 points (2) Honda 315 (3) Ducati 255
Moto2: (1) Alex de Angelis  (Motobi) (2) Scott Redding  (Suter) (3) Andrea Iannone  (Speed Up)
Riders' championship standings (after 15 of 17 rounds): (1) Toni Elías  (Moriwaki) 271 points (2) Julián Simón  (Suter) 181 (3) Iannone 179
Manufacturers' championship standings: (1) Moriwaki 296 points (2) Suter 281 (3) Speed Up 204
125cc: (1) Marc Márquez  (Derbi) (2) Pol Espargaró  (Derbi) (3) Nicolás Terol  (Aprilia)
Riders' championship standings (after 15 of 17 rounds): (1) Márquez 272 points (2) Terol 260 (3) Espargaró 255
Manufacturers' championship standings: (1) Derbi 360 points (2) Aprilia 303 (3) Honda 23

Rugby union
Heineken Cup pool stage, matchday 2:
Pool 4: Biarritz  35–15  Ulster
Standings (after 2 matches): Biarritz 9 points,  Bath 6, Ulster 5,  Aironi 0.
Pool 5:
Perpignan  35–14  Benetton Treviso
Leicester Tigers  46–10  Scarlets
Standings (after 2 matches): Leicester Tigers 10 points, Perpignan 6, Scarlets 5, Benetton Treviso 1.
Pool 6: London Wasps  38–26  Glasgow Warriors
Standings (after 2 matches):  Toulouse 8 points, London Wasps 6, Glasgow Warriors 4,  Newport Gwent Dragons 0.
Amlin Challenge Cup pool stage, matchday 2:
Pool 4: Leeds Carnegie  13–22  Stade Français
Standings (after 2 matches): Stade Français 9 points, Leeds Carnegie,  București Oaks 4,  Overmach Parma 1.

Snooker
Players Tour Championship:
Event 6 in Sheffield:
Final: Dominic Dale  4–3 Martin Gould 
Dale wins the third professional title of his career.
Order of Merit (after 8 of 12 events): (1) Barry Pinches  17,300 (2) Mark Selby  17,000 (3) Mark Williams  16,400

Tennis
ATP World Tour:
Shanghai Rolex Masters:
Final: Andy Murray  def. Roger Federer  6–3, 6–2
Murray wins his second title of the year – both against Federer – and the 16th of his career.
WTA Tour:
Generali Ladies Linz:
Final: Ana Ivanovic  def. Patty Schnyder  6–1, 6–2
Ivanovic wins the ninth title of her career.
HP Open:
Final: Tamarine Tanasugarn  def. Kimiko Date-Krumm  7–5, 6–7(4), 6–1
Tanasugarn wins the fourth title of her career.

October 16, 2010 (Saturday)

American football
NCAA: (unbeaten teams in bold)
AP Top 10:
(18) Wisconsin 31, (1) Ohio State 18
(3) Boise State 48, San Jose State 0
(4) TCU 31, Brigham Young 3
Texas 20, (5) Nebraska 13
(6) Oklahoma 52, Iowa State 0
(7) Auburn 65, (12) Arkansas 43
(8) Alabama 23, Mississippi 10
(9) LSU 32, McNeese State 10
Kentucky 31, (10) South Carolina 28
The Wildcats defeat a Steve Spurrier-coached team for the first time in 18 tries.
Idle: (2) Oregon
Other games:
Hawaii 27, (19) Nevada 21
Mississippi State 10, (22) Florida 7
San Diego State 27, (23) Air Force 25
Washington 35, (24) Oregon State 34 (2OT)
Other unbeaten teams: (11) Utah, (13) Michigan State, (20) Oklahoma State, (21) Missouri

Athletics
World Half Marathon Championships in Nanning, China:
Men:  Wilson Kiprop  1:00:07  Zersenay Tadese  1:00:11  Sammy Kitwara  1:00:22
Women:  Florence Kiplagat  1:08:24  Dire Tune  1:08:34  Peninah Arusei  1:09:05
Men's team:   3:01:32   3:03:04   3:05:26
Women's team:   3:26:59   3:27:33   3:33:40

Auto racing
Chase for the Sprint Cup:
Bank of America 500 in Concord, North Carolina: (1)  Jamie McMurray (Chevrolet; Earnhardt Ganassi Racing) (2)  Kyle Busch (Toyota; Joe Gibbs Racing) (3)  Jimmie Johnson (Chevrolet; Hendrick Motorsports)
Drivers' championship standings (after 31 of 36 races): (1) Johnson 5843 points (2)  Denny Hamlin (Toyota; Joe Gibbs Racing) 5802 (3)  Kevin Harvick (Chevrolet; Richard Childress Racing) 5766

Baseball
Major League Baseball postseason:
American League Championship Series:
Game 2, Texas Rangers 7, New York Yankees 2. Series tied 1–1.
National League Championship Series:
Game 1, San Francisco Giants 4, Philadelphia Phillies 3. Giants lead series 1–0.
Nippon Professional Baseball Climax Series:
Pacific League Final Stage:
Game 3, Fukuoka SoftBank Hawks 1, Chiba Lotte Marines 0. Hawks lead series 3–1.
Central League First Stage:
Game 1, Yomiuri Giants 3, Hanshin Tigers 1. Giants lead best-of-3 series 1–0.

Cycling
Monument Classics:
Giro di Lombardia: (1) Philippe Gilbert  6h 46' 33" (2) Michele Scarponi  + 12" (3) Pablo Lastras  + 55"
Final UCI World Rankings:  Joaquim Rodríguez  551 points  Alberto Contador  482  Gilbert 437

Figure skating
ISU Junior Grand Prix in Ostrava, Czech Republic: (skaters in bold qualify for ISU Junior Grand Prix Final)
Ice dance:  Ekaterina Pushkash / Jonathan Guerreiro  136.80  Tiffany Zahorski / Alexis Miart  127.82  Anastasia Galyeta / Alexei Shumski  124.14
Final standings: Ksenia Monko / Kirill Khaliavin , Alexandra Stepanova / Ivan Bukin  30 points, Pushkash / Guerreiro 28, Charlotte Lichtman / Dean Copely , Evgenia Kosigina / Nikolai Moroshkin , Victoria Sinitsina / Ruslan Zhiganshin  26, Galyeta / Shumski 24, Marina Antipova / Artem Kudashev , Zahorski / Miart, Anastasia Cannuscio / Colin McManus  22 (2).
Men:  Yan Han  193.62  Artur Dmitriev Jr  185.73  Alexander Majorov  180.73
Final standings: Andrei Rogozine , Yan 30 points, Richard Dornbush , Joshua Farris  28, Keegan Messing , Max Aaron , Zhan Bush  24, Gordei Gorshkov , Dmitriev 22.

Football (soccer)
CAF Champions League semifinals, second leg: (first leg score in parentheses)
JS Kabylie  0–0 (1–3)  TP Mazembe. TP Mazembe win 3–1 on aggregate.
CAF Confederation Cup group stage, matchday 6: (teams in bold advance to the semifinals)
Group A:
ASFAN  0–0  Al-Hilal
Ittihad  2–0  Djoliba
Final standings: Al-Hilal 13 points, Ittihad 12, Djoliba 7, ASFAN 2.

Mixed martial arts
UFC 120 in London:
Welterweight bout: Claude Patrick  def. James Wilks  by unanimous decision (30–27, 30–27, 30–27)
Heavyweight bout: Cheick Kongo  and Travis Browne  draw (28–28, 28–28, 28–28)
Welterweight bout: Mike Pyle  def. John Hathaway  by unanimous decision (30–27, 30–27, 30–27)
Welterweight bout: Carlos Condit  def. Dan Hardy  by knockout (punch)
Middleweight bout: Michael Bisping  def. Yoshihiro Akiyama  by unanimous decision (30–27, 30–27, 30–27)

Rugby union
Heineken Cup pool stage, matchday 2:
Pool 1: Edinburgh  27–31  Northampton Saints
Standings (after 2 matches): Northampton Saints 8 points,  Castres,  Cardiff Blues 5, Edinburgh 2.
Pool 2:
Racing Métro  16–9  Clermont
Saracens  23–25  Leinster
Standings (after 2 matches): Leinster 9 points, Clermont 5, Racing Métro 4, Saracens 1.
Pool 3: Munster  45–18  Toulon
Standings (after 2 matches): Munster 6 points,  Ospreys 5,  London Irish, Toulon 4.
Pool 4: Aironi  6–22  Bath
Standings: Bath 6 points (2 matches),  Ulster 5 (1),  Biarritz 4 (1), Aironi 0 (2).
Pool 6: Newport Gwent Dragons  19–40  Toulouse
Standings: Toulouse 8 points (2 matches),  Glasgow 4 (1),  London Wasps 1 (1), Newport Gwent Dragons 0 (2).
Amlin Challenge Cup pool stage, matchday 2:
Pool 1: Harlequins  55–17  Cavalieri Prato
Standings (after 2 matches): Harlequins 6 points,  Connacht,  Bayonne 5, Cavalieri Prato 4.
Pool 2: Petrarca Padova  9–56  Sale Sharks
Standings: Sale Sharks 10 points (2 matches),  Brive 5 (1),  El Salvador 0 (1), Petrarca Padova 0 (2).
Pool 4: București Oaks  20–19  Overmach Parma
Standings:  Stade Français 5 points (1 match),  Leeds Carnegie 4 (1), București Oaks 4 (2), Overmach Parma 1 (2).
Pool 5:
Gloucester  90–7  Rovigo
La Rochelle  30–23  Agen
Standings (after 2 matches): La Rochelle 10 points, Gloucester 6, Agen 5, Rovigo 0.
 Currie Cup semifinals:
 16–12 Blue Bulls
Western Province 31–7 Free State Cheetahs

October 15, 2010 (Friday)

Auto racing
Nationwide Series:
Dollar General 300 in Concord, North Carolina: (1)  Brad Keselowski (Dodge; Penske Racing) (2)  Martin Truex Jr. (Toyota; Diamond-Waltrip Racing) (3)  Justin Allgaier (Dodge; Penske Racing)
Drivers' championship standings (after 31 of 35 races): (1) Keselowski 4954 points (2)  Carl Edwards (Ford; Roush Fenway Racing) 4504 (3)  Kyle Busch (Toyota; Joe Gibbs Racing) 4439

Baseball
Major League Baseball postseason:
American League Championship Series:
Game 1, New York Yankees 6, Texas Rangers 5. Yankees lead series 1–0.
Nippon Professional Baseball Climax Series:
Pacific League Final Stage:
Game 2, Fukuoka SoftBank Hawks 3, Chiba Lotte Marines 1. Hawks lead series 2–1.

Basketball
NCAA (Philippines) at San Juan, Philippines:
Men's Finals: San Beda College 85, San Sebastian College-Recoletos 70, San Beda wins series in 2 games
San Beda win 15th NCAA championship by winning all 16 elimination round games and 2 games in the Finals.

Cricket
Zimbabwe in South Africa:
1st ODI in Bloemfontein:  351/6 (50 overs; Colin Ingram 124, Hashim Amla 110);  287/6 (50 overs; Brendan Taylor 145*). South Africa win by 64 runs; lead 3-match series 1–0.

Figure skating
ISU Junior Grand Prix in Ostrava, Czech Republic: (skaters in bold qualify for ISU Junior Grand Prix Final)
Ice dance – short dance: (1) Ekaterina Pushkash / Jonathan Guerreiro  57.88 (2) Tiffany Zahorski / Alexis Miart  52.69 (3) Marina Antipova / Artem Kudashev  52.16
Pairs:  Yu Xiaoyu / Jin Yang  138.66  Ashley Cain / Joshua Reagan  134.14  Natasha Purich / Raymond Schultz  131.77
Final standings: Ksenia Stolbova / Fedor Klimov  30 points, Sui Wenjing / Han Cong  28, Yu / Jin, Narumi Takahashi / Mervin Tran  26, Purich / Schultz 22, Anna Silaeva / Artur Minchuk  20, Cain / Reagan 18, Taylor Steele / Robert Schultz , Brittany Jones / Kurtis Gaskell , Tatiana Danilova / Andrei Novoselov  14.
Ladies:  Vanessa Lam  156.41  Risa Shoji  155.23  Polina Shelepen  152.92
Final standings: Adelina Sotnikova , Elizaveta Tuktamysheva  30 points, Shoji 28, Shelepen, Christina Gao , Yasmin Siraj  26, Kristiene Gong  22, Kiri Baga , Li Zijun , Ira Vannut  20.

Football (soccer)
Caribbean Championship Qualifying Group Stage One: (teams in bold advance to Qualifying Group Stage Two)
Group C in Paramaribo, Suriname:
 2–3 
 2–1 
Standings (after 2 matches): Guyana, Suriname 6 points, Netherlands Antilles, Saint Lucia 0.
Group D in San Cristóbal, Dominican Republic:  0–10 
Standings: , Dominica 3 points (1 match), British Virgin Islands 0 (2).
Copa Libertadores de Fútbol Femenino in Barueri, São Paulo, Brazil:
Semifinals:
Everton  0–0 (5–4 pen.)  Deportivo Quito
Santos  2–0  Boca Juniors

Rugby union
Heineken Cup pool stage, matchday 2:
Pool 1: Castres  27–20  Cardiff Blues
Standings: Castres, Cardiff Blues 5 points (2 matches),  Northampton Saints 4 (1),  Edinburgh 1 (1).
Pool 3: Ospreys  27–16  London Irish
Standings: Ospreys 5 points (2 matches),  Toulon 4 (1), London Irish 4 (2),  Munster 1 (1).
Amlin Challenge Cup pool stage, matchday 2:
Pool 1: Connacht  16–13  Bayonne
Standings: Connacht, Bayonne 5 points (2 matches);  Cavalieri Prato 4 (1),  Harlequins 1 (1).
Pool 3: Bourgoin  19–34  Exeter Chiefs
Standings (after 2 matches):  Montpellier 8 points, Exeter Chiefs 5,  Newcastle Falcons 4, Bourgoin 1.

October 14, 2010 (Thursday)

Baseball
Nippon Professional Baseball Climax Series:
Pacific League Final Stage:
Game 1, Chiba Lotte Marines 3, Fukuoka SoftBank Hawks 1. Series tied 1–1.

Basketball
 Israeli League Cup in Jerusalem:
Final: Hapoel Jerusalem 77–87 Maccabi Tel Aviv
Maccabi Tel Aviv win the Cup for the second time after three years break.

Cricket
New Zealand in Bangladesh:
4th ODI in Mirpur:  241 (48.1 overs; Shakib Al Hasan 106);  232 (49.3 overs; Kane Williamson 108). Bangladesh win by 9 runs; lead 5-match series 3–0.

Figure skating
ISU Junior Grand Prix in Ostrava, Czech Republic:
Ladies – short program: (1) Vanessa Lam  53.05 (2) Polina Shelepen  50.46 (3) Kiri Baga  49.74
Pairs – short program: (1) Ashley Cain / Joshua Reagan  46.87 (2) Natasha Purich / Raymond Schultz  46.62 (3) Ekaterina Petaikina / Maxim Kurduykov  46.24
Men – short program: (1) Yan Han  66.19 (2) Alexander Majorov  62.67 (3) Liu Jiaxing  62.59

Football (soccer)
Caribbean Championship Qualifying Group Stage One:
Group D in San Cristóbal, Dominican Republic:  17–0 
Copa Sudamericana Round of 16, first leg:
Universitario  0–1  Palmeiras

Multi-sport events
Commonwealth Games in Delhi, India:
Athletics:
Men's marathon:  John Kelai  2:14:35  Michael Shelley  2:15:28  Amos Matui  2:15:58
Women's marathon:  Irene Kosgei  2:34:32  Irene Mogake  2:34:43  Lisa Jane Weightman  2:35:25
Badminton:
Mixed doubles:  Chin Ee Hui/Koo Kien Keat   Nathan Robertson/Jenny Wallwork   Chayut Triyachart/Yao Lei 
Women's doubles:  Jwala Gutta/Ashwini Machimanda   Yao Lei/Shinta Sari   Tang He Tian/Kate Wilson-Smith 
Men's singles:  Lee Chong Wei   Rajiv Ouseph   Parupalli Kashyap 
Men's doubles:  Koo Kien Keat/Tan Boon Heong   Nathan Robertson/Anthony Clark   Hendri Saputra/Hendra Wijaya 
Women's singles:  Saina Nehwal   Wong Mew Choo   Liz Cann 
Gymnastics (rhythmic):
Rope:  Chrystalleni Trikomiti  25.800 points  Naazmi Johnston  25.100  Elaine Koon  24.950
Hoop:  Elaine Koon  25.300 points  Francesca Jones  24.750  Chrystalleni Trikomiti  24.500
Ball:  Naazmi Johnston  25.100 points  Elaine Koon  24.500  Chrystalleni Trikomiti  24.350
Ribbon:  Chrystalleni Trikomiti  25.700 points  Naazmi Johnston  24.600  Elaine Koon  24.400
Hockey:
Men's tournament:      
Netball:
Tournament:      
Table tennis:
Women's wheelchair singles:  Kate Oputa   Catherine Morrow   Faith Obiora 
Women's doubles:  Li Jiawei/Sun Beibei   Feng Tianwei/Wang Yuegu   Mouma Das/Poulomi Ghatak 
Men's singles:  Yang Zi   Gao Ning   Sharath Kamal

Rugby union
Amlin Challenge Cup pool stage, matchday 2:
Pool 3: Montpellier  32–8  Newcastle Falcons
Standings: Montpellier 8 points (2 matches), Newcastle Falcons 4 (2),  Bourgoin,  Exeter Chiefs 1 (1).

Snooker
Premier League Snooker – League phase in Inverness:
Mark Selby  5–1 Marco Fu 
Neil Robertson  3–3 Mark Williams 
Standings: Selby, Ding Junhui  4 points (4 matches), Williams 4 (3), Shaun Murphy , Ronnie O'Sullivan , Fu 3 (3), Robertson 1 (2).

October 13, 2010 (Wednesday)

Cricket
Australia in India:
2nd Test in Bangalore, day 5:  478 (141 overs) and 223 (75.2 overs);  495 (144.5 overs) and 207/3 (45 overs). India win by 7 wickets; win 2-match series 2–0.

Football (soccer)
Caribbean Championship Qualifying Group Stage One:
Group C in Paramaribo, Suriname:
 1–0 
 2–1 
Copa Sudamericana Round of 16, first leg:
Goiás  1–0  Peñarol
Atlético Mineiro  2–0  Santa Fe
Emelec  2–1  Avaí

Multi-sport events
Commonwealth Games in Delhi, India:
Aquatics (diving):
Women's 3m springboard:  Sharleen Stratton  376.00 points  Jennifer Abel  338.55  Jaele Patrick  326.15
Men's 10m platform:  Tom Daley  538.35 points  Matthew Mitcham  509.15  Bryan Lomas  487.15
Boxing:
Light-flyweight:  Paddy Barnes   Japhet Uutoni   Amandeep Singh   Muhammad Waseem 
Bantamweight:  Manju Wanniarachchi   Sean McGoldrick   Bruno Julie   Tirafalo Seoko 
Lightweight:  Thomas Stalker   Josh Taylor   Jai Bhagwan   Lomalito Moala 
Welterweight:  Patrick Gallagher   Callum Smith   Carl Hield   Dilbag Singh 
Light-heavyweight:  Callum Johnson   Thomas McCarthy   Jermaine Asare   Joshua Makonjio 
Flyweight:  Suranjoy Singh   Benson Njangiru   Haroon Iqbal   Oteng Oteng 
Light-welterweight:  Manoj Kumar   Bradley Saunders   Louis Colin   Valentino Knowles 
Middleweight:  Eamonn O'Kane   Anthony Ogogo   Keiran Harding   Vijender Singh 
Heavyweight:  Simon Vallily   Steven Ward   Stephen Simmons   Awusone Yekeni 
Super-heavyweight:  Paramjeet Samota   Tariq Abdul Haqq   Junior Fa   Blaise Yepmou 
Cycling (road):
Women's time trial:  Tara Whitten  38:59.30  Linda Villumsen  39:04.15  Julia Shaw  39:09.52
Men's time trial:  David Millar  47:18.66  Alex Dowsett  48:13.48  Luke Durbridge  48:19.22
Gymnastics (rhythmic):
Women's individual all-around:  Naazmi Johnston  100.100 points  Chrystalleni Trikomiti  98.975  Elaine Koon  96.000
Hockey:
Women's tournament:      
Lawn bowls:
Women's singles:  Natalie Melmore   Val Smith   Kelsey Cottrell 
Men's singles:  Robert Weale   Leif Selby   Gary Kelly 
Shooting:
Men's 25m standard pistol singles:  Bin Gai  570 points  Roger Daniel  563  Samaresh Jung  559
Open full bore pairs:   (Mike Collings, John Snowden) 588 points (GR)   587   584
Women's 10m air pistol singles:  Bibiana Ng  481.9 points  Heena Sidhu  481.6  Dina Aspandiyarova  478.8
Open full bore singles:  Parag Patel  396 points (GR)  James Corbett  395  David Calvert  393
Men's 50m prone rifle singles:  Jonathan Hammond  696.9 points  Warren Potent  695.4  Matthew Hall  694.1
Men's skeet singles:  Richard Brickell  144+7 points  Georgios Achilleos  144+6  Andreas Chasikos  143+6+2
Squash:
Women's doubles:  Jaclyn Hawkes/Joelle King   Jenny Duncalf/Laura Massaro   Kasey Brown/Donna Urquhart 
Mixed doubles:  Kasey Brown/Cameron Pilley   Joelle King/Martin Wright   Nicol David/Beng Hee Ong 
Men's doubles:  Adrian Grant/Nick Matthew   Stewart Boswell/David Palmer   Ryan Cuskelly/Cameron Pilley 
Table tennis:
Men's doubles:  Sharath Kamal/Subhajit Saha   Gao Ning/Yang Zi   Andrew Baggaley/Liam Pitchford 
Women's singles:  Feng Tianwei   Yu Mengyu   Wang Yuegu

October 12, 2010 (Tuesday)

Baseball
Major League Baseball postseason:
American League Division Series:
Game 5, Texas Rangers 5, Tampa Bay Rays 1. Rangers win series 3–2.
The Rangers win a postseason series for the first time in franchise history. This is also the first MLB postseason series ever in which all games were won by the road team.

Cricket
Australia in India:
2nd Test in Bangalore, day 4:  478 (141 overs) and 202/7 (65 overs);  495 (144.5 overs; Sachin Tendulkar 214). Australia lead by 185 runs with 3 wickets remaining.

Football (soccer)
UEFA Euro 2012 qualifying, matchday 4:
Group A:
 1–0 
 0–3 
 4–4 
Standings: Germany 12 points (4 matches), Austria 7 (3), Turkey 6 (4), Belgium 4 (4), Azerbaijan 3 (3), Kazakhstan 0 (4).
Group B:
 4–0 
 0–1 
 1–1 
Standings (after 4 matches): Russia 9 points, Armenia, Republic of Ireland, Slovakia 7 points, Macedonia 4, Andorra 0.
Group C:
 1–1 
 0–0  (match abandoned after 6 minutes due to crowd trouble)
On 29 October, Italy were awarded a 3–0 victory. (AP via USA Today)
 0–1 
Standings: Italy 10 points (4 matches), Slovenia 7 (4), Estonia 6 (4), Northern Ireland 5 (3), Serbia 4 (4), Faroe Islands 1 (5).
Group D:
 2–0 
 2–0 
Standings: France 9 points (4 matches), Belarus 8 (4), Albania 5 (4),  4 (3),  2 (3), Luxembourg 1 (4).
Group E:
 1–2 
 4–1 
 0–2 
Standings: Netherlands 12 points (4 matches), Hungary 9 (4), Sweden 6 (3), Moldova 6 (4), Finland 0 (3), San Marino 0 (4).
Group F:
 1–1 
 2–1 
Standings: Greece 8 points (4 matches),  7 (3), Georgia 6 (4), Israel, Latvia 4 (4),  0 (3).
Group G:
 4–1 
 0–0 
Standings: Montenegro 10 points (4 matches), England 7 (3), Switzerland,  3 (3), Wales 0 (3).
Group H:
 1–3 
 2–0 
Standings:  9 points (3 matches), Portugal 7 (4), Denmark 6 (3), Cyprus 1 (3), Iceland 0 (3).
Group I:
 0–2 
 2–3 
Standings: Spain 9 points (3 matches), Czech Republic 6 (3), Scotland 4 (4),  4 (3), Liechtenstein 0 (3).
2011 UEFA European Under-21 Championship qualification play-offs, second leg (teams in bold qualify for Final Tournament; first leg score in parentheses):
 0–0 (1–2) . England win 2–1 on aggregate.
 0–3 (1–2) . Spain win 5–1 on aggregate.
 3–0 (a.e.t.) (0–2) . Belarus win 3–2 on aggregate.
 0–2 (0–3) . Czech Republic win 5–0 on aggregate.
 0–2 (3–1) . 3–3 on aggregate, Ukraine advance on away goals rule.
Copa Sudamericana Round of 16, second leg (first leg score in parentheses):
Deportes Tolima  3–0 (0–2)  Banfield. 3–3 on points; Deportes Tolima win 3–2 on aggregate.
Copa Sudamericana Round of 16, first leg:
Unión San Felipe  4–2  LDU Quito
Copa Libertadores de Fútbol Femenino in Barueri, São Paulo, Brazil: (teams in bold advance to the semifinals)
Group B:
Boca Juniors  1–1  Everton
Universidad Autónoma  7–0  UP de Iquitos
Final standings: Everton 10 points, Boca Juniors 8, Universidad Autónoma 7,  Florida 3, UP de Iquitos 0.

Multi-sport events
Commonwealth Games in Delhi, India:
Aquatics (diving):
Men's 10m synchronised platform:  Max Brick/Tom Daley  439.65 points  Matthew Mitcham/Ethan Warren  423.81  Kevin Geyson/Eric Sehn  394.80
Women's 1m springboard:  Jennifer Abel  301.75 points  Sharleen Stratton  299.15  Émilie Heymans  296.10
Men's 3m synchronised springboard:  Alexandre Despatie/Reuben Ross  430.35 points  Matthew Mitcham/Ethan Warren  424.47  Bryan Lomas/Ken Yeoh  404.64
Athletics:
Men's:
Javelin throw:  Jarrod Bannister  81.71m  Stuart Farquhar  78.15m  Kashinath Naik  74.29m
Triple jump:  Tosin Oke  17.16m  Lucien Mamba Schlick  17.14m  Renjith Maheshwary  17.07m
4 × 100 m relay:   (Ryan Scott, Leon Baptiste, Marlon Devonish, Mark Lewis-Francis) 38.74   38.79   38.89
1500m:  Silas Kiplagat  3:41.78  James Magut  3:42.27  Nick Willis  3:42.38
4 × 400 m relay:   (Joel Milburn, Kevin Moore, Brendan Cole, Sean Wroe) 3:03.30   3:03.84   3:03.97
Women's:
Pole vault:  Alana Boyd  4.40m  Marianna Zachariadi  4.40m  Kate Dennison  4.25m  Carly Dockendorf  4.25m  Kelsie Hendry  4.25m
4 × 100 m relay:   (Katherine Endacott, Montell Douglas, Laura Turner, Abiodun Oyepitan) 44.19   45.24   45.25
5000m:  Vivian Cheruiyot  15:55.12  Sylvia Jebiwott Kibet  15:55.61  Iness Chepkesis Chenonge  16:02.47
4 × 400 m relay:  (Manjit Kaur, Sini Jose, Ashwini Akkunji, Mandeep Kaur) 3:27.77   3:29.51   3:30.20
Gymnastics (rhythmic):
Women's team:   (Naazmi Johnston, Janine Murray, Danielle Prince) 235.775 points   224.325   220.475
Rugby sevens:
Men's event:      
Shooting:
Men's:
25m standard pistol pairs:   (Bin Gai, Lip Meng Poh) 1116 points   1103   1098
50m prone rifle pairs:   (Neil Stirton, Jonathan Hammond) 1181 points   1178   1174+64
Women's:
10m air pistol pairs:   (Heena Sidhu, Annu Raj Singh) 759+21 points   759+21   759+14
50m prone rifle singles:  Jennifer McIntosh  597 points (GR)  Tejaswini Sawant  594  Johanne Brekke  593
Table tennis:
Mixed doubles:  Yang Zi/Wang Yuegu   Feng Tianwei/Gao Ning   Paul Drinkhall/Joanna Parker 
Weightlifting:
Women's powerlifting bench press:  Esther Oyema  148.1 kg  Ganiyatu Onaolopo  139.3 kg  Osamwenyobor Arasomwan  124.6 kg
Men's powerlifting bench press:  Yakunu Adesokan  215.1 kg  Anthony Ulonnam  210.6 kg  Ikechukwu Obichukwu  196 kg

October 11, 2010 (Monday)

American football
NFL, Week 5:
Monday Night Football: New York Jets 29, Minnesota Vikings 20

Baseball
Major League Baseball postseason:
National League Division Series:
Game 4, San Francisco Giants 3, Atlanta Braves 2. Giants win series 3–1.
The Giants book a place in the NLCS against the Philadelphia Phillies and end the managing career of Braves skipper Bobby Cox.

Cricket
Australia in India:
2nd Test in Bangalore, day 3:  478 (141 overs);  435/5 (122 overs; Sachin Tendulkar 191*, Murali Vijay 139). India trail by 43 runs with 5 wickets remaining in the 1st innings.
New Zealand in Bangladesh:
3rd ODI in Mirpur:  173 (42.5 overs);  177/3 (40 overs). Bangladesh win by 7 wickets; lead 5-match series 2–0.
Afghanistan in Kenya:
3rd ODI in Nairobi:  188 (43 overs);  189/2 (41.3 overs). Kenya win by 8 wickets; win 3-match series 2–1.

Football (soccer)
2011 UEFA European Under-21 Championship qualification play-offs, second leg (teams in bold qualify for Final Tournament; first leg score in parentheses):
 1–1 (1–4) . Switzerland win 5–2 on aggregate.
 1–2 (1–2) . Iceland win 4–2 on aggregate.
Copa Libertadores de Fútbol Femenino in Barueri, São Paulo, Brazil: (teams in bold advance to the semifinals)
Group A:
Santos  7–0  Deportivo Quito
Formas Íntimas  1–2  River Plate
Final standings: Santos 12 points, Deportivo Quito 7, River Plate 4,  Caracas, Formas Íntimas 3.

Multi-sport events
Commonwealth Games in Delhi, India:
Aquatics (diving):
Men's 3m springboard:  Alexandre Despatie  513.75 points  Reuben Ross  457.15  Grant Nel  456.55
Women's 10m platform:  Pandelela Rinong Pamg  371.05 points  Melissa Wu  369.50  Alex Croak  355.40
Athletics:
Men's:
Pole vault:  Steven Hooker  5.60m  Steven Lewis  5.60m  Max Eaves  5.40m
3000m steeplechase:  Richard Mateelong  8:16.39  Ezekiel Kemboi  8:18.47  Brimin Kipruto  8:19.65
10,000m:  Moses Ndiema Kipsiro  27:57.39  Daniel Salel  27:57.57  Joseph Birech  27:58.58
Women's:
100m hurdles:  Sally Pearson  12.67  Angela Whyte  12.98  Andrea Miller  13.25
Discus throw:  Krishna Poonia  61.51m  Harwant Kaur  60.16m  Seema Antil  58.46m
200m:  Cydonie Mothersille  22.89  Abiodun Oyepitan  23.26  Adrienne Power  23.52
800m:  Nancy Langat  2:00.01  Nikki Hamblin  2:00.05  Diane Cummins  2:00.13
Lawn bowls:
Men's pairs:   (Shaun Addinall, Gerald Baker)    
Women's pairs:   (Ellen Falkner, Amy Monkhouse)    
Shooting:
Women's prone 50m rifle pairs:   (Jen McIntosh, Kay Copland) 1169+60 points   1169+52   1168
Men's skeet pairs:   (Georgios Achilleos, Andreas Chasikos) 194 points (EGR)   191   191
Weightlifting:
Men's +105 kg:  Damon Kelly  397 kg  Itte Detenamo  397 kg  George Kobaladze  386 kg

Tennis
ATP World Tour:
China Open:
Final: Novak Djokovic  def. David Ferrer  6–2, 6–4
Djokovic wins his second title of the season and the 18th of his career.
WTA Tour:
China Open:
Final: Caroline Wozniacki  def. Vera Zvonareva  6–3, 3–6, 6–3
Wozniacki wins her sixth title of the season and the 12th of her career. Wozniacki also becomes World No. 1 for the first time in her career.

October 10, 2010 (Sunday)

American football
NFL, Week 5:
Indianapolis Colts 19, Kansas City Chiefs 9
The Colts knock off the league's last unbeaten team.
Jacksonville Jaguars 36, Buffalo Bills 26
Tampa Bay Buccaneers 24, Cincinnati Bengals 21
Atlanta Falcons 20, Cleveland Browns 10
Detroit Lions 44, St. Louis Rams 6
Baltimore Ravens 31, Denver Broncos 17
Chicago Bears 23, Carolina Panthers 6
Washington Redskins 16, Green Bay Packers 13 (OT)
New York Giants 34, Houston Texans 10
Arizona Cardinals 30, New Orleans Saints 20
Tennessee Titans 34, Dallas Cowboys 27
Oakland Raiders 35, San Diego Chargers 27
Sunday Night Football: Philadelphia Eagles 27, San Francisco 49ers 24
Byes: Miami Dolphins, New England Patriots, Pittsburgh Steelers, Seattle Seahawks

Athletics
World Marathon Majors:
Chicago Marathon:
Men:  Samuel Wanjiru  2:06:24  Tsegaye Kebede  2:06:43  Feyisa Lilesa  2:08:10
Wanjiru wins the race for the second straight year.
World Marathon Majors standings: (1) Wanjiru 75 points (2) Kebede 65 (3) Deriba Merga , Emmauel Mutai  35
Women:  Liliya Shobukhova  2:20:25  Atsede Baysa  2:23:40  Mariya Konovalova  2:23:50
Shobukhova wins the race for the second straight year.
World Marathon Majors standings: (1) Shobukhova 85 points (2) Irina Mikitenko  41 (3) Salina Kosgei  36
Shobukhova secures the title with one event (New York City Marathon) remaining.

Auto racing
Formula One:
 in Suzuka: (1) Sebastian Vettel  (Red Bull–Renault) (2) Mark Webber  (Red Bull-Renault) (3) Fernando Alonso  (Ferrari)
Drivers' championship standings (after 16 of 19 races): (1) Webber 220 points (2) Alonso 206 (3) Vettel 206
Constructors' championship standings: (1) Red Bull 426 points (2) McLaren 381 (3) Ferrari 334
Chase for the Sprint Cup:
Pepsi Max 400 in Fontana: (1)  Tony Stewart (Chevrolet; Stewart Haas Racing) (2)  Clint Bowyer (Chevrolet; Richard Childress Racing) (3)  Jimmie Johnson (Chevrolet; Hendrick Motorsports)
Drivers' championship standings (after 30 of 36 races): (1) Johnson 5673 points (2)  Denny Hamlin (Toyota; Joe Gibbs Racing) 5637 (3)  Kevin Harvick (Chevrolet; Richard Childress Racing) 5619
V8 Supercars:
Supercheap Auto Bathurst 1000 in Bathurst, New South Wales: (1) Craig Lowndes /Mark Skaife  (Holden Commodore) (2) Jamie Whincup /Steve Owen  (Holden Commodore) (3) Garth Tander /Cameron McConville  (Holden Commodore)
Drivers' championship standings (after 18 of 26 races): (1) James Courtney  (Ford Falcon) 2323 points (2) Whincup 2198 (3) Lowndes 2039

Baseball
Major League Baseball postseason:
American League Division Series:
Game 4, Tampa Bay Rays 5, Texas Rangers 2. Series tied 2–2.
National League Division Series:
Game 3, San Francisco Giants 3, Atlanta Braves 2. Giants lead series 2–1.
Game 3, Philadelphia Phillies 2, Cincinnati Reds 0. Phillies win series 3–0.
Nippon Professional Baseball Climax Series:
Pacific League First Stage:
Game 2, Chiba Lotte Marines 5, Saitama Seibu Lions 4 (11 innings). Marines win series 2–0.

Cricket
Australia in India:
2nd Test in Bangalore, day 2:  478 (141 overs; Marcus North 128);  128/2 (34.2 overs). India trail by 350 runs with 8 wickets remaining in the 1st innings.
Zimbabwe in South Africa:
2nd T20I in Kimberley:  194/6 (20 overs);  186/7 (20 overs). South Africa win by 8 runs; win 2-match series 2–0.

Equestrianism
FEI World Games in Lexington, Kentucky, United States:
Four-in-Hand-Driving Individual:  Boyd Exell  134.04 points  IJsbrand Chardon  135.24  Tucker Johnson  150.06
Four-in-Hand-Driving Team:   279.77 points   300.92   322.20
Para Dressage Individual – Freestyle Tests Grade IV:  Sophie Wells  on Pinocchio 78.50%  Michele George  on FBW Rainman 78.05%  Frank Hosmar  on Tiesto 77.25%
Vaulting Team:   8.029 points   8.010   7.990

Football (soccer)
Africa Cup of Nations qualification, matchday 2:
Group A:  0–0 
Standings (after 2 matches): Cape Verde 4 points,  3, Zimbabwe 2,  1.
Group B:
 0–1 
 1–0 
Standings (after 2 matches): Guinea 6 points, Nigeria, Ethiopia 3, Madagaskar 0.
Group C:  1–0 
Standings (after 2 matches): , Libya 4 points, Zambia 3,  0.
Group D:  2–0 
Standings (after 2 matches): Central African Republic,  4 points, Algeria 1.
Group G:
 1–0 
 0–0 
Standings (after 2 matches): South Africa 4 points, Niger 3, Sierra Leone 2, Egypt 1.
Group I:
 0–0 
 3–1 
Standings (after 2 matches): Ghana, Sudan 4 points, Congo 3, Swaziland 0.
Group K:  1–2 
Standings (after 4 matches):  10 points, Tunisia 7,  6, Togo 2,  1.
Caribbean Championship Qualifying Group Stage One: (teams in bold advance to Qualifying Group Stage Two)
Group B in Kingstown, Saint Vincent and the Grenadines:
 4–0 
 0–0 
Final standings: Saint Kitts and Nevis, Saint Vincent, Barbados 5 points, Montserrat 0.
Copa Libertadores de Fútbol Femenino in Barueri, São Paulo, Brazil: (teams in bold advance to the semifinals)
Group B:
Boca Juniors  2–2  Universidad Autónoma
Everton  6–0  Florida
Standings: Everton 9 points (3 matches), Boca Juniors 7 (3), Universidad Autónoma 4 (3), Florida 3 (4),  UP de Iquitos 0 (3).

Golf
Constellation Energy Senior Players Championship in Potomac, Maryland, United States:
Final leaderboard (all USA): (T1) Mark O'Meara & Michael Allen 273 (−7) (3) Loren Roberts 275 (−5)
Sudden-death playoff: O'Meara 4 (E) def. Allen 5 (+1)
O'Meara wins his first senior major, and second Champions Tour title.
PGA Tour Fall Series:
McGladrey Classic in Sea Island, Georgia:
Winner: Heath Slocum  266 (−14)
Slocum wins his fourth career PGA Tour title.
European Tour:
Alfred Dunhill Links Championship in Scotland:
Winner: Martin Kaymer  271 (−17)
Kaymer wins his third European Tour title of the season, and eighth overall.
LPGA Tour:
Navistar LPGA Classic in Prattville, Alabama:
Winner: Katherine Hull  269 (−19)
Hull wins her second career LPGA Tour title.

Motorcycle racing
Moto GP:
Malaysian Grand Prix in Sepang:
MotoGP: (1) Valentino Rossi  (Yamaha) (2) Andrea Dovizioso  (Honda) (3) Jorge Lorenzo  (Yamaha)
Riders' championship standings (after 15 of 18 rounds): (1) Lorenzo 313 points (2) Dani Pedrosa  (Honda) 228 (3) Rossi 181
Lorenzo seals his first premier class world title.
Manufacturers' championship standings: (1) Yamaha 334 points (2) Honda 305 (3) Ducati 230
Moto2: (1) Roberto Rolfo  (Suter) (2) Alex de Angelis  (Motobi) (3) Andrea Iannone  (Speed Up)
Riders' championship standings (after 14 of 17 rounds): (1) Toni Elías  (Moriwaki) 262 points (2) Julián Simón  (Suter) 168 (3) Iannone 163
Elías becomes the first Moto2 World Champion.
Manufacturers' championship standings: (1) Moriwaki 287 points (2) Suter 261 (3) Speed Up 188
125cc: (1) Marc Márquez  (Derbi) (2) Pol Espargaró  (Derbi) (3) Nicolás Terol  (Aprilia)
Riders' championship standings (after 14 of 17 rounds): (1) Márquez 247 points (2) Terol 244 (3) Espargaró 235
Manufacturers' championship standings: (1) Derbi 335 points (2) Aprilia 287 (3) Honda 20

Multi-sport events
Commonwealth Games in Delhi, India:
Aquatics (diving):
Women's synchronised 3m springboard:  Jennifer Abel/Émilie Heymans  318.90 points  Briony Cole/Sharleen Stratton  300.84  Jaele Patrick/Olivia Wright  295.32
Men's 1m springboard:  Alexandre Despatie  468.15 points  Matthew Mitcham  441.00  Scott Robertson  409.15
Women's synchronised 10m platform:  Melissa Wu/Alex Croak  335.76 points  Pandelela Rinong Pamg/Mun Yee Leong  328.38  Briony Cole/Anabelle Smith  325.50
Archery:
Women's recurve individual:  Deepika Kumari   Alison Williamson   Dola Banerjee 
Men's recurve individual:  Rahul Banerjee   Jason Lyon   Jayanta Talukdar 
Athletics:
Men's:
Discus throw:  Benn Harradine  65.45m  Vikas Gowda  63.69m  Carl Myerscough  60.64m
1500m T54:  Kurt Fearnley  3:19.86  Richard Colman  3:20.90  Josh Cassidy  3:21.14
400m hurdles:  David Greene  48.52  L. J. van Zyl  48.63  Rhys Williams  49.19
800m:  Boaz Kiplagat Lalang  1:46.60  Richard Kiplagat  1:46.95  Abraham Kiplagat  1:47.37
200m:  Leon Baptiste  20.45  Lansford Spence  20.49  Christian Malcolm  20.52
Women's:
High jump:  Nicole Forrester  1.91m  Sheree Francis  1.88m  Levern Spencer  1.88m
400m hurdles:  Muizat Ajoke Odumosu  55.28  Eilidh Child  55.62  Nickiesha Wilson  56.06
Long jump:  Alice Falaiye  6.50m  M. A. Prajusha  6.47m  Tabia Charles  6.44m
Cycling (road):
Women's road race:  Rochelle Gilmore   Lizzie Armitstead   Chloe Hosking 
Men's road race:  Allan Davis   Hayden Roulston   David Millar 
Lawn bowls:
Women's triples:   (Tracy-Lee Botha, Susan Nel, Santjie Steyn)    
Men's triples:   (Johann du Plessis, Wayne Perry, Gidion Vermeulen)    
Shooting:
Men's 25m centrefire pistol singles:  Harpreet Singh  580 points  Vijay Kumar  574+49  Lip Meng Poh  574+48
Women's 10m air rifle singles:  Jasmine Ser  501.7 points (EGR, FGR)  Nur Ayuni Halim  497.5  Nur Suryani Mohamed Taibi  496.9
Men's 25m trap singles:  Aaron Heading  147 points (FGR)  Michael Diamond  146  Manavjit Singh Sandhu  144+2
Tennis:
Women's doubles:  Sally Peers/Anastasia Rodionova   Jessica Moore/Olivia Rogowska   Rushmi Chakravarthi/Sania Mirza 
Men's singles:  Somdev Devvarman   Greg Jones   Matt Ebden 
Mixed doubles:  Jocelyn Rae/Colin Fleming   Anastasia Rodionova/Paul Hanley   Sarah Borwell/Ken Skupski 
Weightlifting:
Women's +75 kg:  Ele Opeloge  285 kg (GR)  Mariam Usman  255 kg  Deborah Acason  245 kg
Men's 105 kg:  Niusila Opeloge  338 kg  Stanislav Chalaev  334 kg  Curtis Onaghinor  332 kg
Wrestling:
Men's freestyle 55 kg:  Azhar Hussain   Ebikewenimo Welson   Anil Kumar 
Men's freestyle 66 kg:  Sushil Kumar   Heinrich Barnes   Chris Prickett 
Men's freestyle 84 kg:  Muhammad Inam   Anuj Kumar   Andrew Dick 
Men's freestyle 120 kg:  Arjan Bhullar   Joginder Kumar   Hugues Onanena

Rugby union
Heineken Cup pool stage, matchday 1:
Pool 4: Bath  11–12  Biarritz
Pool 6: Toulouse  18–16  London Wasps
Amlin Challenge Cup pool stage, matchday 1:

Snooker
Players Tour Championship:
Event 5 in Sheffield:
Final: Ding Junhui  4–1 Jamie Jones 
Ding wins his seventh professional title.
Order of Merit (after 7 of 12 events): (1) Barry Pinches  17,100 (2) Mark Williams  16,400 (3) Mark Selby  15,500

Snowboarding
Snowboard World Cup in Landgraaf, Netherlands:
Men's Parallel Slalom:  Andreas Prommegger   Roland Fischnaller   Aaron March 
Women's Parallel Slalom:  Yekaterina Tudegesheva   Heidi Neururer   Alena Zavarzina

Tennis
ATP World Tour:
Rakuten Japan Open Tennis Championships:
Final: Rafael Nadal  def. Gaël Monfils  6–1, 7–5
Nadal wins his seventh title of the season and the 43rd of his career.

Volleyball
Men's World Championship in Rome, Italy:
3rd place:   3–1 
Final:   0–3  
Brazil win the title for the third straight time.

October 9, 2010 (Saturday)

American football
NCAA:
AP Top 10:
(19) South Carolina 35, (1) Alabama 21
(2) Ohio State 38, Indiana 10
(3) Oregon 43, Washington State 23
(4) Boise State 57, Toledo 14
(5) TCU 45, Wyoming 0
(8) Auburn 37, Kentucky 34
Oregon State 29, (9) Arizona 27
(10) Utah 68, Iowa State 27
Other games:
(12) LSU 33, (14) Florida 29
(17) Michigan State 34, (18) Michigan 17
(23) Florida State 45, (13) Miami 17
Played earlier this week: (7) Nebraska
Idle: (6) Oklahoma

Auto racing
Nationwide Series:
CampingWorld.com 300 in Fontana, California: (1)  Kyle Busch (Toyota; Joe Gibbs Racing) (2)  Brad Keselowski (Dodge; Penske Racing) (3)  Kevin Harvick (Chevrolet; Kevin Harvick Inc.)
Drivers' championship standings (after 30 of 35 races): (1) Keselowski 4764 points (2)  Carl Edwards (Ford; Roush Fenway Racing) 4380 (3) Busch 4279

Baseball
Major League Baseball postseason:
American League Division Series:
Game 3, Tampa Bay Rays 6, Texas Rangers 3. Rangers lead series 2–1.
Game 3,  New York Yankees 6, Minnesota Twins 1. Yankees win series 3–0.
Nippon Professional Baseball Climax Series:
Pacific League First Stage:
Game 1, Chiba Lotte Marines 6, Saitama Seibu Lions 5 (11 innings). Marines lead series 1–0.

Cricket
Australia in India:
2nd Test in Bangalore, day 1:  285/5 (85.5 overs); .
Afghanistan in Kenya:
2nd ODI in Nairobi:  139 (41 overs);  143/4 (27 overs). Afghanistan win by 6 wickets; 3-match series level 1–1.

Equestrianism
FEI World Games in Lexington, Kentucky, United States:
Driving Marathon:   
Jumping The Rolex Top Four:   
Para Dressage Individual Championship Tests:   
Vaulting Freestyle-Final Female/Male:

Figure skating
ISU Junior Grand Prix in Dresden, Germany: (skaters in bold qualify for ISU Junior Grand Prix Final)
Men:  Richard Dornbush  195.23  Gordei Gorshkov  185.84  Ryuichi Kihara  177.92
Standings (after 6 of 7 events): Andrei Rogozine  30 points (2 events), Dornbush, Joshua Farris  28 (2), Max Aaron , Zhan Bush  24 (2), Gorshkov 22 (2), Jason Brown , Liam Firus  18 (2)...Keegan Messing , Yan Han  15 (1), Artem Grigoriev  13 (1).
Ice Dance:   Evgenia Kosigina / Nikolai Moroshkin  126.92  Marina Antipova / Artem Kudashev  118.80  Charlotte Lichtman / Dean Copely  118.21
Standings (after 6 of 7 events): Ksenia Monko / Kirill Khaliavin , Alexandra Stepanova / Ivan Bukin  30 points (2 events), Lichtman / Copely, Kosigina / Moroshkin, Victoria Sinitsina / Ruslan Zhiganshin  26 (2), Anastasia Cannuscio / Colin McManus  22 (2), Gabriella Papadakis / Guillaume Cizeron  20 (2), Geraldine Bott / Neil Brown , Lauri Bonacorsi / Travis Mager  18 (2)... Ekaterina Pushkash / Jonathan Guerreiro , Anastasia Galyeta / Alexei Shumski , Antipova / Kudashev 13 (1).

Football (soccer)
UEFA Euro 2012 qualifying, matchday 3:
Group D:  2–0 
Standings (after 3 matches): France 6 points,  5,  4, Romania 2,  1.
Group F:  1–2 
Standings (after 3 matches): Croatia 7 points,  5, Israel 4,  3,  0.
Africa Cup of Nations qualification, matchday 1:
Group A:  2–1 
Standings:  3 points (1 match), Mali 3 (2),  1 (1), Liberia 1 (2).
Group C:  0–1 
Standings: Mozambique 4 points (2 matches),  3 (1),  1 (1), Comoros 0 (2).
Group D:  0–1 
Standings: Morocco 4 points (2 matches),  1 (1), Tanzania 1 (2).
Group E:
 1–1 
 7–0 
Standings (after 2 matches): Senegal 6 points, Cameroon 4, Congo DR 1, Mauritius 0.
Group F:  3–1 
Standings: Burkina Faso 3 points (1 match), Gambia 3 (2),  0 (1).
Group H:
 0–1 
 0–3 
Standings (after 2 matches): Côte d'Ivoire 6 points, Benin 4, Burundi 1, Rwanda 0.
Group J:
 0–0 
 1–0 
Standings (after 2 matches): Uganda 4 points, Guinea-Bissau, Angola 3, Kenya 1.
Group K:  6–2 
Standings:  10 points (4 matches), Malawi 6 (4),  4 (3),  2 (3), Chad 1 (4).
2011 UEFA European Under-21 Championship qualification play-offs, first leg:
 1–3 
 2–1 
Copa Libertadores de Fútbol Femenino in Barueri, São Paulo, Brazil: (teams in bold advance to the semifinals)
Group A:
Santos  4–0  Formas Íntimas
Deportivo Quito  1–0  Caracas
Standings: Santos 9 points (3 matches), Deportivo Quito 7 (3), Formas Íntimas 3 (3), Caracas 3 (4),  River Plate 1 (3).

Golf
Constellation Energy Senior Players Championship in Potomac, Maryland, United States:
Leaderboard after day 3 (all USA): (1) Mark O'Meara 205 (−5) (T2) Michael Allen, Russ Cochran & Loren Roberts 207 (−3)

Multi-sport events
Commonwealth Games in Delhi, India:
Aquatics (swimming):
Men's:
50m freestyle:  Brent Hayden  22.01 (GR)  Roland Mark Schoeman  22.14  Gideon Louw  22.22
200m breaststroke:  Brenton Rickard  2:10.89 (GR)  Michael Jamieson  2:10.97  Christian Sprenger  2:11.44
100m freestyle S10:  Benoît Huot  53.70 (GR)  Andrew Pasterfield  55.04  Robert Welbourn  55.10
1500m freestyle:  Ryan Cochrane  15:01.49  Heerden Herman  15:03.70  Daniel Fogg  15:13.50
4 × 100 m medley relay:   (Ashley Delaney, Brenton Rickard, Geoff Huegill, Eamon Sullivan) 3:33.15 (GR)   3:36.12   3:36.31
Women's:
200m butterfly:  Jessicah Schipper  2:07.04  Audrey Lacroix  2:07.31  Ellen Gandy  2:07.75
100m butterfly S9:  Natalie du Toit  1:07.32  Stephanie Millward  1:13.11  Ellie Cole  1:14.04
400m individual medley:  Hannah Miley  4:38.83 (GR)  Samantha Hamill  4:39.45  Keri-anne Payne  4:41.07
4 × 100 m medley relay:   (Emily Seebohm, Leisel Jones, Jessicah Schipper, Alicia Coutts) 3:56.99   4:00.09   4:03.96
Archery:
Women's compound individual:  Nicky Hunt   Doris Jones   Cassie McCall 
Men's compound individual:  Duncan Busby   Christopher White   Septimus Cilliers 
Athletics:
Men's:
20km walk:  Jared Tallent  1:22:18 (GR)  Luke Adams  1:22:31  Harminder Singh  1:23:28
High jump:  Donald Thomas  2.32m  Trevor Barry  2.29m  Kabelo Kgosiemang  2.26m
Long jump:  Fabrice Lapierre  8.30m  Greg Rutherford  8.22m  Ignisious Gaisah  8.12m
400m:  Mark Mutai  45.44  Sean Wroe  45.46  Ramon Miller  45.55
Women's:
20km walk:  Johanna Jackson  1:34:22 (GR)  Claire Tallent  1:36:55  Grace Wanjiru  1:37:49
Shot put:  Valerie Adams  20.47m (GR)  Cleopatra Brown  19.03m  Tasele Satupai  16.43m
3000m steeplechase:  Milcah Chemos Cheywa  9:40.96  Mercy Wanjiku  9:41.54  Gladys Kipkemoi  9:52.51
Javelin throw:  Sunette Viljoen  62.34m (GR)  Kimberley Mickle  60.90m  Justine Robbeson  60.03m
Heptathlon:  Louise Hazel  6156 points  Jessica Zelinka  6100  Grace Clements  5819
Shooting:
Men's:
25m centrefire pistol pairs:   (Vijay Kumar, Harpreet Singh) 1159 points   1140   1139
50m rifle 3 positions singles:  Gagan Narang  1262.2 points (GR, FGR)  Jonathan Hammond  1255.3  James Huckle  1254.9
Women's:
10m air rifle pairs:   (Nur Suryani Mohamed Taibi, Nur Ayuni Halim) 793 points   790   785
Trap singles:  Anita North  93 points (FGR)  Shona Marshall  91  Gaby Ahrens  88
Table tennis:
Men's team event:   (Gao Ning, Yang Zi, Ma Liang)    
Tennis:
Women's singles:  Anastasia Rodionova   Sania Mirza   Sally Peers 
Men's doubles:  Paul Hanley/Peter Luczak   Ross Hutchins/Ken Skupski   Mahesh Bhupathi/Leander Paes 
Weightlifting:
Men's 94 kg:  Faavae Faauliuli  334 kg  Peter Kirkbride  333 kg  Benedict Uloko  332 kg
Women's 75 kg:  Hadiza Zakari  239 kg (GR)  Marie-Eve Beauchemin-Nadeau  225 kg  Laishram Devi  216 kg
Wrestling:
Men's freestyle 60 kg:  Yogeshwar Dutt   James Mancini   Sasha Madyarchyk 
Men's freestyle 74 kg:  Narsingh Yadav   Richard Addinall   Evan Macdonald 
Men's freestyle 96 kg:  Sinvie Boltic   Korey Jarvis   Leon Rattigan

Rugby union
Heineken Cup pool stage, matchday 1:
Pool 1: Cardiff Blues  18–17  Edinburgh
Pool 2:
Leinster  38–22  Racing Métro
Clermont  25–10  Saracens
Pool 3:
Toulon  19–14  Ospreys
London Irish  23–17  Munster
Pool 5:
Benetton Treviso  29–34  Leicester Tigers
Scarlets  43–34  Perpignan
Amlin Challenge Cup pool stage, matchday 1:

Volleyball
Men's World Championship in Italy:
Semifinals in Rome:
 2–3 
Cuba reach the final for the first time since 1990.
 1–3 
Two-time defending champion Brazil reach the final for the third straight time.
11th place in Florence:  1–3 
9th place in Florence:  3–1 
7th place in Modena:  3–0 
5th place in Modena:  3–0

October 8, 2010 (Friday)

Baseball
Major League Baseball postseason:
National League Division Series:
Game 2, Philadelphia Phillies 7, Cincinnati Reds 4. Phillies lead series 2–0.
Game 2, Atlanta Braves 5, San Francisco Giants 4 (11 innings). Series tied 1–1.

Cricket
New Zealand in Bangladesh:
2nd ODI in Mirpur:  vs. . Match abandoned without a ball bowled; Bangladesh lead 5-match series 1–0.
Zimbabwe in South Africa:
1st T20I in Bloemfontein:  168/4 (20 overs);  169/3 (15.5 overs). South Africa win by 7 wickets; lead 2-match series 1–0.

Equestrianism
FEI World Games in Lexington, Kentucky, United States:
Driving Dressage:   
Jumping Individual Combination:   
Para Dressage Individual Championship Tests:   
Vaulting Compulsory-Individual Female/Male:

Figure skating
ISU Junior Grand Prix in Dresden, Germany: (skaters in bold qualify for ISU Junior Grand Prix Final)
Ice Dance short dance: (1) Evgenia Kosigina / Nikolai Moroshkin  54.32 (2) Marina Antipova / Artem Kudashev  49.42 (3) Charlotte Lichtman / Dean Copely   48.51
Pairs:  Sui Wenjing / Han Cong  167.13  Narumi Takahashi / Mervin Tran  159.38  Anna Silaeva / Artur Minchuk  131.03
Standings (after 3 of 4 events): Ksenia Stolbova / Fedor Klimov  30 points (2 events), Sui / Han 28 (2), Takahashi / Tran 26 (2), Brittany Jones / Kurtis Gaskell , Tatiana Danilova / Andrei Novoselov  14 (2), Yu Xiaoyu / Jin Yang , Silaeva / Minchuk, Natasha Purich / Raymond Schultz  11 (1)... Taylor Steele / Robert Schultz  9 (1).
Ladies:  Elizaveta Tuktamysheva  172.78  Christina Gao   155.67  Ira Vannut  141.87
Standings (after 6 of 7 events): Adelina Sotnikova , Tuktamysheva 30 points (2 events), Gao, Yasmin Siraj  26 (2), Kristiene Gong  22 (2), Vannut 20 (2), Shion Kokubun  18 (2), Rosa Sheveleva  16 (2), Polina Shelepen , Risa Shoji  15 (1)... Kiri Baga  13 (1).

Football (soccer)
UEFA Euro 2012 qualifying, matchday 3:
Group A:
 0–2 
 3–0 
 3–0 
Standings: Germany 9 points (3 matches), Austria 6 (2), Turkey 6 (3), Belgium 3 (3), Kazakhstan 0 (3), Azerbaijan 0 (2).
Group B:
 3–1 
 0–2 
 2–3 
Standings (after 3 matches): Slovakia, Russia, Republic of Ireland 6 points, Armenia, Macedonia 4, Andorra 0.
Group C:
 1–3 
 0–0 
 5–1 
Standings: Italy 7 points (3 matches), Estonia 6 (3), Northern Ireland 4 (2), Serbia, Slovenia 4 (3), Faroe Islands 0 (4).
Group D:
 0–0 
 1–1 
Standings: Albania, Belarus 5 points (3 matches), Bosnia and Herzegovina 4 (3),  3 (2),  2 (2), Luxembourg 1 (3).
Group E:
 8–0 
 0–1 
Standings: Netherlands 9 points (3 matches),  6 (2), Hungary 6 (3), Moldova 3 (3),  0 (2), San Marino 0 (3).
Group F:
 1–0 
 1–0 
Standings: Georgia, Greece 5 points (3 matches),  4 (2), Latvia 3 (3), Malta 0 (3).
Group G:
 1–0 
 0–1 
Standings: Montenegro 9 points (3 matches),  6 (2), Bulgaria 3 (3), Wales, Switzerland 0 (2).
Group H:
 1–2 
 3–1 
Standings: Norway 9 points (3 matches), Portugal 4 (3), Denmark 3 (2), Cyprus 1 (2),  0 (2).
Group I:
 1–0 
 3–1 
Standings: Spain 6 points (2 matches), Scotland, Lithuania 4 (3), Czech Republic 3 (2),  0 (2).
OFC Women's Championship in Auckland, New Zealand:
Third place playoff:  0–2  
Final:   11–0  
New Zealand win the title for the fourth time, and qualify for 2011 FIFA Women's World Cup.
2011 UEFA European Under-21 Championship qualification play-offs, first leg:
 2–1 
 3–0 
 2–0 
Caribbean Championship Qualifying Group Stage One:
Group B in Kingstown, Saint Vincent and the Grenadines:
 0–5 
 1–1 
Standings (after 2 matches): Saint Vincent, Barbados 4 points, Saint Kitts and Nevis 2, Montserrat 0.
Copa Libertadores de Fútbol Femenino in Barueri, São Paulo, Brazil:
Group B:
Boca Juniors  12–1  UP de Iquitos
Universidad Autónoma  6–1  Florida
Standings: Boca Juniors,  Everton 6 points (2 matches), Universidad Autónoma 3 (2), Florida 3 (3), UP de Iquitos 0 (3).

Golf
Constellation Energy Senior Players Championship in Potomac, Maryland, United States:
Leaderboard after day 2 (all USA): (1) Russ Cochran 134 (−6) (2) Michael Allen 135 (−5) (3) Mark O'Meara 136 (−4)

Multi-sport events
Commonwealth Games in Delhi, India:
Aquatics (swimming):
Men's:
100m butterfly:  Geoff Huegill  51.69 (GR)  Ryan Pini  52.50  Antony James  52.50
50m breaststroke:  Cameron van der Burgh  27.18 (GR)  Glenn Snyders  27.67  Brenton Rickard  27.67
100m backstroke:  Liam Tancock  53.59 (GR)  Daniel Bell  54.43  Ashley Delaney  54.51
100m freestyle S8:  Ben Austin  1:00.44  Sean Fraser  1:00.77  Blake Cochrane  1:00.95
200m individual medley:  James Goddard  1:58.10 (GR)  Joe Roebuck  1:59.86  Leith Brodie  2:00.00
Women's:
50m freestyle:  Yolane Kukla  24.86  Francesca Halsall  24.98  Hayley Palmer  25.01
200m backstroke:  Meagen Nay  2:07.56 (GR)  Elizabeth Simmonds  2:07.90  Emily Seebohm  2:08.28
100m breaststroke:  Leisel Jones  1:05.84  Samantha Marshall  1:07.97  Kate Haywood  1:08.29
400m freestyle:  Rebecca Adlington  4:05.68 (GR)  Kylie Palmer  4:07.85  Jazmin Carlin  4:08.22
50m backstroke:  Sophie Edington  28.00 (GR)  Gemma Spofforth  28.03  Georgia Davies  28.33  Emily Seebohm  28.33
4 × 100 m freestyle relay:   (Alicia Coutts, Felicity Galvez, Marieke Guehrer, Emily Seebohm) 3:36.36 (GR)   3:40.03   3:42.12
Archery:
Women's recurve team:   (Dola Banerjee, Deepika Kumari, Bombayala Laishram) 207 points   206   202
Men's recurve team:   (Matthew Gray, Mat Masonwells, Taylor Worth) 219 points   212   221
Athletics:
Men's:
110m hurdles:  Andy Turner  13.38  William Sharman  13.50  Lawrence Somerset Clarke  13.70
Hammer throw:  Chris Harmse  73.15m  Alex Smith  72.95m  Mike Floyd  69.34m
Decathlon:  Jamie Adjetey-Nelson  8070 points  Brent Newdick  7899  Martin Brockman  7712
Women's:
1500m T54:  Diane Roy  3:53.95  Chineme Obeta  4:09.29  Anita Fordjour  4:18.83
Triple jump:  Trecia-Kaye Smith  14.19m  Ayanna Alexander  13.91m  Tabia Charles  13.84m
400m:  Amantle Montsho  50.10 (GR)  Aliann Pompey  51.65  Christine Amertil  51.96
1500m:  Nancy Langat  4:05.26 (GR)  Nikki Hamblin  4:05.97  Stephanie Twell  4:06.15
10,000m:  Grace Momanyi  32:34.11  Doris Changeywo  32:36.97  Kavita Raut  33:05.28
Badminton:
Mixed team:   (Koo Kien Keat, Chin Ee Hui, Lee Chong Wei, Wong Mew Choo, Boon Heong Tan)    
Cycling (track):
Women's individual pursuit:  Alison Shanks  3:30.875  Wendy Houvenaghel  3:32.137  Tara Whitten  3:35.810
Men's team sprint:   (Dan Ellis, Jason Niblett, Scott Sunderland) 43.772 (GR)   44.239   45.040
Men's scratch:  Cameron Meyer   Michael Freiberg   Zachary Bell 
Gymnastics (artistic):
Men's:
Vault:  Luke Folwell  15.762 points  Ashish Kumar  15.312  Ian Galvan  15.037
Parallel bars:  Joshua Jefferis  14.625 points  Luke Folwell  14.200  Prashanth Sellathurai  14.000
Horizontal bar:  Dimitris Krasias  13.900 points  Anderson Loran  13.625  Max Whitlock  13.575
Women's:
Balance beam:  Lauren Mitchell  14.475 points  Heem Wei Lim  12.825  Cynthia Lemieux-Guillemette  12.825
Floor exercise:  Imogen Cairns  14.200 points  Lauren Mitchell  13.925  Ashleigh Brennan  13.425
Shooting:
Men's trap pairs:   (Michael Diamond, Adam Vella) 198 points (GR)    
Women's trap pairs:   (Laetisha Scanlan, Stacy Roiall) 93 points (GR)   91   90
Men's 50m rifle 3 positions pairs:   (Gagan Narang, Imran Hassan Khan) 2325 points (GR)   2308+105   2308+104
Men's 25m rapid fire pistol singles:  Vijay Kumar  787.5 points (GR, FGR)  Hasli Amir Hasan  760.3  Gurpreet Singh  758.7
Men's 10m air pistol singles:  Omkar Singh  681.8 points  Bin Gai  676.2  Daniel Repacholi  674
Squash:
Women's singles:  Nicol David   Jenny Duncalf   Kasey Brown 
Men's singles:  Nick Matthew   James Willstrop   Peter Barker 
Table tennis:
Women's team event:   (Feng Tianwei, Wang Yuegu, Li Jiawei)    
Weightlifting:
Women's 69 kg:  Christine Girard  235 kg (GR)  Marie Janet Georges  216 kg  Itohan Ebireguesele  215 kg
Men's 85 kg:  Simplice Ribouem  333 kg  Richard Patterson  331 kg  Mathieu Marineau  325 kg
Wrestling:
Women's freestyle 51 kg:  Ifeoma Nwoye   Babita Kumari   Jessica Macdonald 
Women's freestyle 59 kg:  Alka Tomar   Tonya Verbeek   Tega Richard 
Women's freestyle 67 kg:  Anita   Megan Buydens   Ifeoma Iheanacho

Rugby union
Heineken Cup pool stage, matchday 1:
Pool 1: Northampton Saints  18–14  Castres
Pool 4: Ulster  30–6  Aironi
Pool 6: Glasgow Warriors  21–13  Newport Gwent Dragons
Amlin Challenge Cup pool stage, matchday 1:

Volleyball
Men's World Championship in Italy:
9th–12th places in Florence:
 3–1 
 0–3 
5th–8th places in Modena:
 3–1 
 3–0

October 7, 2010 (Thursday)

American football
NCAA AP Top 10:
(7) Nebraska 48, Kansas State 13

Baseball
Major League Baseball postseason:
American League Division Series:
Game 2, Texas Rangers 6, Tampa Bay Rays 0. Rangers lead series 2–0.
Game 2, New York Yankees 5, Minnesota Twins 2. Yankees lead series 2–0.
National League Division Series:
Game 1, San Francisco Giants 1, Atlanta Braves 0. Giants lead series 1–0.

Cricket
Afghanistan in Kenya:
1st ODI in Nairobi:  180 (46.2 overs);  88 (27.5 overs). Kenya win by 92 runs; lead 3-match series 1–0.

Figure skating
ISU Junior Grand Prix in Dresden, Germany:
Ladies short program: (1) Elizaveta Tuktamysheva  57.35 (2) Christina Gao  47.66 (3) Polina Agafonova  47.20
Pairs short program: (1) Narumi Takahashi / Mervin Tran  56.43 (2) Sui Wenjing / Han Cong  55.32 (3) Anna Silaeva / Artur Minchuk  48.30
Men's short program: (1) Richard Dornbush  69.05 (2) Gordei Gorshkov  62.95 (3) Jorik Hendrickx  60.81

Football (soccer)
2011 FIFA Women's World Cup qualification (UEFA):
Repechage I, second leg: (first leg score in parentheses)
 0–0 (3–1) . Switzerland win 3–1 on aggregate and advance to Repechage II.
2011 UEFA European Under-21 Championship qualification play-offs, first leg:
 4–1 
 2–1 
Copa Libertadores de Fútbol Femenino in Barueri, São Paulo, Brazil:
Group A:
River Plate  1–4  Caracas
Formas Íntimas  0–1  Deportivo Quito
Standings:  Santos 6 points (2 matches), Deportivo Quito 4 (2), Formas Íntimas 3 (2), Caracas 3 (3), River Plate 1 (3).

Golf
Constellation Energy Senior Players Championship in Potomac, Maryland, United States: (USA unless stated)
Leaderboard after day 1: (1) Tom Kite 67 (−3) (T2) Michael Allen, Mark O'Meara and Joe Ozaki  68 (−2)

Multi-sport events
Commonwealth Games in Delhi, India:
Aquatics (swimming):
Men's:
100m freestyle:  Brent Hayden  47.98 (GR)  Simon Burnett  48.54  Eamon Sullivan  48.69
400m individual medley:  Chad le Clos  4:13.25 (GR)  Joe Roebuck  4:15.84  Riaan Schoeman  4:16.86
Women's:
100m butterfly:  Alicia Coutts  57.53  Ellen Gandy  58.06  Jemma Lowe  58.42
100m freestyle S9:  Natalie du Toit  1:02.36 (GR)  Stephanie Millward  1:03.69  Ellie Cole  1:05.20
800m freestyle:  Rebecca Adlington  8:24.69  Wendy Trott  8:26.69  Melissa Gorman  8:32.37
Archery:
Women's compound team:   (Danielle Brown, Nicky Hunt, Nichola Simpson) 232 points   229   223
Men's compound team:   (Duncan Busby, Liam Grimwood, Christopher White) 231 points   229   234
Athletics:
Men's:
Shot put (seated):  Kyle Pettey  1021 points (WR)  Dan West  969  Hamish MacDonald  889
100m T46:  Simon Patmore  11.14  Samkelo Radebe  11.25  Ayuba Abdullahi  11.37
Shot put:  Dylan Armstrong  21.02m (GR)  Dorian Scott  20.19m  Dale Stevenson  19.99m
100m:  Lerone Clarke  10.12  Mark Lewis-Francis  10.20  Aaron Armstrong  10.24
Women's:
Hammer throw:  Sultana Frizell  68.57m (GR)  Carys Parry  64.93m  Zoe Derham  64.04m
100m T37:  Katrina Hart  14.36  Jenny McLoughlin  14.68  Johanna Benson  14.81
100m:  Natasha Mayers  11.37  Katherine Endacott  11.44  Delphine Atangana  11.48
The race was originally won by Sally Pearson  but she was disqualified along with Laura Turner  for making false starts. Oludamola Osayomi  inherited the gold but she was also stripped of the medal for testing positive for the banned stimulant, methylhexanamine. (BBC Sport)
Cycling (track):
Men's:
Sprint:  Shane Perkins   Scott Sunderland   Sam Webster 
Team pursuit:   (Jack Bobridge, Michael Hepburn, Cameron Meyer, Dale Parker) 3:55.421 (GR)    
Women's:
Scratch:  Megan Dunn   Joanne Kiesanowski   Anna Blyth 
Sprint:  Anna Meares   Becky James   Emily Rosemond 
Gymnastics (artistic):
Men's:
Floor exercise:  Thomas Pichler  14.675 points  Reiss Beckford  14.625  Ashish Kumar  14.475
Pommel horse:  Prashanth Sellathurai  15.500 points  Max Whitlock  15.125  David-Jonathan Chan  14.200
Rings:  Samuel Offord  14.825 points  Luke Folwell  14.750  Herodotos Giorgallas  14.650
Women's:
Vault:  Imogen Cairns  13.775 points  Jennifer Khwela  13.737  Gabby May  13.712
Uneven bars:  Lauren Mitchell  14.150 points  Georgia Bonora  13.925  Cynthia Lemieux-Guillemette  13.350
Shooting:
Men's 10m air pistol pairs:   (Omkar Singh, Gurpreet Singh) 1163 points (GR)   1143   1139
Men's 25m rapid fire pistol pairs:   (Vijay Kumar, Gurpreet Singh) 1162 points (GR)   1144   1125
Women's 50m rifle 3 positions singles:  Alethea Sedgman  676.0 points  Jasmine Ser  672.6  Aqilah Sudhir  671.3
Men's double trap singles:  Stevan Walton  190 points  Ronjan Sodhi  186+8  Tim Kneale  186+7+6
Synchronised swimming:
Women's solo:  Marie-Pier Boudreau Gagnon  47.667 points  Jenna Randall  45.417  Lauren Smith  40.167
Women's duet:   (Chloé Isaac, Marie-Pier Boudreau Gagnon) 47.667 points   45.084   39.750
Weightlifting:
Men's 77 kg:  Yukio Peter  333 kg (GR)  Ben Turner  308 kg  Sudhir Kumar Chitradurga  297 kg
Women's 63 kg:  Obioma Okoli  211 kg  Michaela Breeze  202 kg  Marie Josephe Fegue  198 kg
Wrestling:
Women's freestyle 48 kg:  Carol Huynh   Nirmala Devi   Odunayo Adekuroye 
Women's freestyle 55 kg:  Geeta Phogat   Emily Bensted   Lovina Edward 
Women's freestyle 63 kg:  Justine Bouchard   Blessing Oborududu   Suman Kundu 
Women's freestyle 72 kg:  Ohenewa Akuffo   Annabel Ali   Hellen Okus

Rugby union
Amlin Challenge Cup pool stage, matchday 1:
Pool 3: Newcastle Falcons  22–16  Bourgoin

Snooker
Premier League Snooker – League phase in Essex:
Mark Selby  2–4 Ding Junhui 
Ronnie O'Sullivan  3–3 Shaun Murphy 
Standings: Ding 4 points (4 matches), Murphy, O'Sullivan 3 (3), Marco Fu , Mark Williams  3 (2), Selby 2 (3), Neil Robertson  0 (1).

October 6, 2010 (Wednesday)

Baseball
Major League Baseball postseason:
American League Division Series:
Game 1, Texas Rangers 5, Tampa Bay Rays 1. Rangers lead series 1–0.
Game 1, New York Yankees 6, Minnesota Twins 4. Yankees lead series 1–0.
National League Division Series:
Game 1, Philadelphia Phillies 4, Cincinnati Reds 0. Phillies lead series 1–0.
Phillies pitcher Roy Halladay throws the first postseason no-hitter since Don Larsen's perfect game in 1956, giving up a walk and striking out eight batters.

Equestrianism
FEI World Games in Lexington, Kentucky, United States:
Jumping Team Final Combination:   
Vaulting Compulsory-Team:

Football (soccer)
2011 FIFA Women's World Cup qualification (UEFA):
Repechage I, second leg: (first leg score in parentheses)
 0–0 (3–0) . Italy win 3–0 on aggregate and advance to Repechage II.
OFC Women's Championship in Auckland, New Zealand:
Semi finals:
 8–0 
 1–0 
Caribbean Championship Qualifying Group Stage One: (teams in bold advance to the Qualifying Group Stage Two)
Group A in Bayamón, Puerto Rico:
 2–1 
 2–0 
Final standings: Puerto Rico 9 points, Cayman Islands 4, Anguilla 3, Saint-Martin 1.
Group B in Kingstown, Saint Vincent and the Grenadines:
 1–1 
 7–0 
AFC Champions League Semi-finals, first leg:
Zob Ahan  1–0  Al-Hilal
Copa Sudamericana Round of 16, first leg:
Newell's Old Boys  6–0  San José
Copa Libertadores de Fútbol Femenino in Barueri, São Paulo, Brazil:
Group B:
UP de Iquitos  1–2  Florida
Universidad Autónoma  1–2  Everton
Standings: Everton 6 points (2 matches),  Boca Juniors 3 (1), Florida 3 (2), Universidad Autónoma 0 (1), UP de Iquitos 0 (2).

Golf
 World Golf Hall of Fame Class of 2011:
 International: Masashi "Jumbo" Ozaki

Multi-sport events
Commonwealth Games in Delhi, India:
Aquatics (swimming):
Men's:
200m backstroke:  James Goddard  1:55.58 (GR)  Gareth Kean  1:57.37  Ashley Delaney  1:58.18
50m freestyle S9:  Matthew Cowdrey  25.33 (WR)  Simon Miller  26.70  Prasanta Karmakar  27.48
50m butterfly:  Jason Dunford  23.35  Geoff Huegill  23.37  Roland Mark Schoeman  23.44
100m breaststroke:  Cameron van der Burgh  1:00.10 (GR)  Christian Sprenger  1:00.29  Brenton Rickard  1:00.46
4 × 200 m freestyle relay:   (Thomas Fraser-Holmes, Nic Ffrost, Ryan Napoleon, Kenrick Monk) 7:10.29 (GR)   7:14.02   7:14.18
Women's:
100m freestyle:  Alicia Coutts  54.09  Emily Seebohm  54.30  Francesca Halsall  54.57
200m breaststroke:  Leisel Jones  2:25.38  Tessa Wallace  2:25.60  Sarah Katsoulis  2:25.92
100m backstroke:  Emily Seebohm  59.79 (GR)  Gemma Spofforth  1:00.02  Julia Wilkinson  1:00.74
4 × 200 m freestyle relay:   (Kylie Palmer, Blair Evans, Bronte Barratt, Meagen Nay) 7:53.71 (GR)   7:57.46   7:58.61
Athletics:
Women's shot put (seated):  Louise Ellery  1110 points  Jess Hamill  979  Gemma Prescott  952
Men's 5000m:  Moses Ndiema Kipsiro  13:31.25  Eliud Kipchoge  13:31.32  Mark Kiptoo  13:32.58
Cycling (track):
Men's:
Keirin:  Josiah Ng   David Daniell   Simon van Velthooven 
Points race:  Cameron Meyer  89 points  George Atkins  52  Mark Christian  37
Women's:
Points race:  Megan Dunn  45 points  Lauren Ellis  40  Tara Whitten  36
Team sprint:   (Anna Meares, Kaarle McCulloch) 33.811   35.908   37.094
Gymnastics (artistic):
Men's individual all-around:  Luke Folwell  85.550 points  Reiss Beckford  85.450  Joshua Jefferis  84.750
Women's individual all-around:  Lauren Mitchell  58.200 points  Emily Little  55.850  Georgia Bonora  54.950
Shooting:
Men's double trap pairs:   (Steven Scott, Stevan Walton) 189 points (GR)   188   185
Men's 10m air rifle singles:  Gagan Narang  703.6 points (GR, FGR)  Abhinav Bindra  698  James Huckle  693.5
Women's 25m pistol singles:  Anisa Sayyed  786.8 points (FGR)  Rahi Sarnobot  781  Bibiana Ng Pei Chin  778.2
Men's 50m pistol singles:  Omkar Singh  653.6 points  Bin Gai  649.6  Swee Hon Lim  644.7
Weightlifting:
Women's 58 kg:  Renu Yumnam  197 kg  Seen Lee  192 kg  Zoe Smith  188 kg
Men's 69 kg:  Ravi Katulu  321 kg  Chinthana Vidanage  308 kg  Mohd Mansor  306 kg
Wrestling:
Men's Greco-Roman 55 kg:  Rajender Kumar   Azhar Hussain   Promise Mwenga 
Men's Greco-Roman 66 kg:  Myroslav Dykun   Jack Bond   Sunil Kumar 
Men's Greco-Roman 84 kg:  Efionayi Agbonavbare   Manoj Kumar   Dean van Zyl 
Men's Greco-Roman 120 kg:  Ivan Popov   Talaram Mamman   Dharmender Dalal

Volleyball
Men's World Championship in Italy: (teams in bold advance to the semifinals)
Pool O in Rome:  3–1 
Final standings: Italy 4 points,  3, France 2.
Pool P in Florence:  0–3 
Final standings:  4 points, Russia 3, Argentina 2.
Pool Q in Florence:  2–3 
Final standings: Cuba 4 points, Bulgaria 3,  2.
Pool R in Rome:  3–0 
Final standings: Brazil 4 points, Germany 3,  2.

October 5, 2010 (Tuesday)

Cricket
Australia in India:
1st Test in Mohali, day 5:  428 (151.4 overs) and 192 (60.5 overs);  405 (108.1 overs) and 216/9 (58.4 overs). India win by 1 wicket; lead 2-match series 1–0.
New Zealand in Bangladesh:
1st ODI in Mirpur:  228 (49.3 overs);  200/8 (37/37 overs). Bangladesh win by 9 runs (D/L); lead 5-match series 1–0.
ICC Intercontinental Cup in Nairobi, day 4: (teams in bold advance to the final)
 464 (105 overs) and 207 (49.1 overs);  160 (39.5 overs) and 344 (90.5 overs; Hamid Hassan 6/87). Afghanistan win by 167 runs.
Final standings: Afghanistan 97 points,  89,  72,  55, Kenya 43,  15,  9.

Football (soccer)
AFC Champions League Semi-finals, first leg:
Al-Shabab  4–3  Seongnam Ilhwa Chunma
AFC Cup Semi-finals, first leg:
Muangthong United  1–0  Al-Ittihad
Al-Riffa  2–0  Al-Qadsia
Copa Libertadores de Fútbol Femenino in Barueri, São Paulo, Brazil:
Group A:
Formas Íntimas  3–1  Caracas
Santos  9–0  River Plate
Standings: Santos 6 points (2 matches), Formas Íntimas 3 (1),  Deportivo Quito 1 (1), River Plate 1 (2), Caracas 0 (2).
 Lamar Hunt U.S. Open Cup Final in Seattle:
Seattle Sounders FC 2–1 Columbus Crew
Sanna Nyassi scores both Sounders goals to lead them to their second U.S. Open Cup in two years of existence.

Multi-sport events
Commonwealth Games in Delhi, India:
Aquatics (swimming):
Men's:
50m backstroke:  Liam Tancock  24.62 (GR)  Hayden Stoeckel  25.08  Ashley Delaney  25.21
200m freestyle:  Robert Renwick  1:47.88  Kenrick Monk  1:47.90  Thomas Fraser-Holmes  1:48.22
Women's:
50m butterfly:  Francesca Halsall  26.24  Marieke Guehrer  26.27  Emily Seebohm  26.29
50m breaststroke:  Leiston Pickett  30.84  Leisel Jones  31.10  Kate Haywood  31.17
50m freestyle S9:  Natalie du Toit  29.17 (GR)  Annabelle Williams  29.42  Stephanie Millward  29.69
Cycling (track):
Women's 500m time trial:  Anna Meares  33.758 (GR)  Kaarle McCulloch  34.780  Becky James  35.236
Men's 1km time trial:  Scott Sunderland  1:01.411 (GR)  Mohd Rizal Tisin  1:02.768  Edward Dawkins  1:02.777
Men's individual pursuit:  Jack Bobridge  4:17.495  Jesse Sergent  4:17.893  Michael Hepburn  Overlap
Gymnastics (artistic):
Women's team competition:   (Georgia Bonora, Ashleigh Brennan, Emily Little, Lauren Mitchell, Georgia Wheeler) 163.700 points   158.200   154.750
Shooting:
Men's:
50m pistol pairs:   (Swee Hon Lim, Bin Gai) 1094 points   1087   1081
10m air rifle pairs:   (Gagan Narang, Abhinav Bindra) 1193 points (GR)   1174   1173
Women's:
25m pistol pairs:   (Rahi Sarnobot, Anisa Sayyed) 1156 points (GR)   1146   1122
50m rifle 3 positions pairs:   (Aqilah Sudhir, Xiang Wei Jasmine Ser) 1149 points (GR)   1143   1142
Weightlifting:
Men's 62 kg:  Aricco Jumitith  276 kg  Naharudin Mahayudin  275 kg  Anton Kurukulasooriyage  272 kg
Women's 53 kg:  Marilou Dozois-Prévost  182 kg  Onyeka Azike  180 kg  Raihan Yusoff  175 kg
Wrestling:
Men's Greco-Roman 60 kg:  Ravinder Singh   Terence Bosson   Romeo Joseph 
Men's Greco-Roman 74 kg:  Sanjay Kumar   Richard Addinall   Hassan Shahsavan 
Men's Greco-Roman 96 kg:  Anil Kumar   Kakoma Bella-Lufu   Eric Feunekes

Volleyball
Men's World Championship in Italy: (teams in bold advance to the semifinals)
Pool O in Rome:  1–3 
Standings: United States 3 points (2 matches), Italy 2 (1),  1 (1).
Pool P in Florence:  1–3 
Standings: Serbia 4 points (2 matches), Russia 1 (1).
Pool Q in Florence:  3–1 
Standings: , Cuba 2 points (1 match), Spain 2 (2).
Pool R in Rome:  3–0 
Standings: Germany,  2 points (1 match), Czech Republic 2 (2).

October 4, 2010 (Monday)

American football
NFL Monday Night Football Week 4: New England Patriots 41, Miami Dolphins 14

Cricket
Australia in India:
1st Test in Mohali, day 4:  428 (151.4 overs) and 192 (60.5 overs);  405 (108.1 overs) and 55/4 (17 overs). India require another 161 runs with 6 wickets remaining.
ICC Intercontinental Cup in Nairobi, day 3:
 464 (105 overs) and 207 (49.1 overs; James Ngoche 5/39);  160 (39.5 overs) and 324/6 (82 overs). Kenya require another 188 runs with 4 wickets remaining.

Football (soccer)
OFC Women's Championship in Auckland, New Zealand: (teams in bold advance to the semifinals)
Group B:
 0–3 
 0–0 
Final standings: Papua New Guinea 9 points, Solomon Islands 4, Tonga 3, Fiji 1.
Caribbean Championship Qualifying Group Stage One:
Group A in Bayamón, Puerto Rico:
 4–1 
 2–0 
Standings (after 2 matches): Puerto Rico 6 points, Cayman Islands 4, Saint-Martin 1, Anguilla 0.
Copa Libertadores de Fútbol Femenino in Barueri, São Paulo, Brazil:
Group B:
Boca Juniors  4–1  Florida
Everton  9–0  UP de Iquitos

Golf
Ryder Cup in Newport, Wales:  14½–13½ 
Session 4 (singles):
Steve Stricker  def. Lee Westwood  2 & 1
Rory McIlroy  and Stewart Cink  match halved
Luke Donald  def. Jim Furyk  1 up
Dustin Johnson  def. Martin Kaymer  6 & 4
Ian Poulter  def. Matt Kuchar  5 & 4
Jeff Overton  def. Ross Fisher  3 & 2
Miguel Ángel Jiménez  def. Bubba Watson  4 & 3
Tiger Woods  def. Francesco Molinari  4 & 3
Edoardo Molinari  and Rickie Fowler  match halved
Phil Mickelson  def. Peter Hanson  4 & 2
Zach Johnson  def. Pádraig Harrington  3 & 2
Graeme McDowell  def. Hunter Mahan  3 & 1
Europe win the Cup for the eighth time, and regain the Cup they lost at Valhalla in 2008. This is the fourth successive time Europe win as the host.

Multi-sport events
Commonwealth Games in Delhi, India:
Aquatics (swimming):
Men's:
400m freestyle:  Ryan Cochrane  3:48.48  Ryan Napoleon  3:48.59  David Carry  3:50.06
200m butterfly:  Chad le Clos  1:56.48 (GR)  Michael Rock  1:57.15  Stefan Hirniak  1:57.26
4 × 100 m freestyle relay:   (Tommaso D'Orsogna, James Magnussen, Kyle Richardson, Eamon Sullivan) 3:13.92 (GR)   3:15.05   3:15.21
Women's:
200m freestyle:  Kylie Palmer  1:57.50  Jazmin Carlin  1:58.29  Rebecca Adlington  1:58.47
200m individual medley:  Alicia Coutts  2:09.70 (GR)  Emily Seebohm  2:10.83  Julia Wilkinson  2:12.09
Gymnastics (artistic):
Men's team competition:   (Joshua Jefferis, Samuel Offord, Thomas Pichler, Prashanth Sellathurai, Luke Wiwatowski) 259.050 points   256.750   248.500
Weightlifting:
Men's 56 kg:  Amirul Hamizan Ibrahim  257 kg  Sukhen Dey  252 kg  Srinivasa Rao Valluri  248 kg
Women's 48 kg:  Augustina Nwaokolo  175 kg (GR)  Soniya Chanu  167 kg  Sandyha Atom  165 kg

Volleyball
Men's World Championship in Italy:
Pool O in Rome:  0–3 
Pool P in Florence:  3–1 
Pool Q in Florence:  1–3 
Pool R in Rome:  2–3

October 3, 2010 (Sunday)

American football
NFL, Week 4:
Atlanta Falcons 16, San Francisco 49ers 14
Cleveland Browns 23, Cincinnati Bengals 20
New York Jets 38, Buffalo Bills 14
St. Louis Rams 20, Seattle Seahawks 3
Denver Broncos 26, Tennessee Titans 20
Green Bay Packers 28, Detroit Lions 26
Baltimore Ravens 17, Pittsburgh Steelers 14
New Orleans Saints 16, Carolina Panthers 14
Jacksonville Jaguars 31, Indianapolis Colts 28
Houston Texans 31, Oakland Raiders 24
Washington Redskins 17, Philadelphia Eagles 12
San Diego Chargers 41, Arizona Cardinals 10
Sunday Night Football: New York Giants 17, Chicago Bears 3
Byes: Dallas Cowboys, Kansas City Chiefs, Minnesota Vikings, Tampa Bay Buccaneers
The Chiefs remain the only unbeaten team after just four weeks.

Auto racing
Chase for the Sprint Cup:
Price Chopper 400 in Kansas City: (1)  Greg Biffle (Ford; Roush Fenway Racing) (2)  Jimmie Johnson (Chevrolet; Hendrick Motorsports) (3)  Kevin Harvick (Chevrolet; Richard Childress Racing)
Drivers' championship standings (after 29 of 36 races): (1) Johnson 5503 points (2)  Denny Hamlin (Toyota; Joe Gibbs Racing) 5495 (3) Harvick 5473
World Rally Championship:
Rallye de France in Alsace: (1) Sébastien Loeb /Daniel Elena  (Citroën C4 WRC) (2) Dani Sordo /Diego Vallejo  (Citroën C4 WRC) (3) Petter Solberg /Chris Patterson  (Citroën C4 WRC)
Drivers' championship standings (after 11 of 13 rounds): (1) Loeb 226 points (2) Sébastien Ogier  (Citroën C4 WRC) 166 (3) Jari-Matti Latvala  (Ford Focus RS WRC 09) 144
Loeb's 60th WRC win gives him his seventh successive title.

Baseball
Major League Baseball:
National League:
Atlanta Braves 8, Philadelphia Phillies 7
San Francisco Giants 3, San Diego Padres 0
The NL playoffs are now set, with the Giants winning the NL West and booking a date with the wild-card Braves in the Division Series, while the Philadelphia Phillies will take on the Cincinnati Reds in the other NLDS.
American League:
Boston Red Sox 8, New York Yankees 4
Tampa Bay Rays 3, Kansas City Royals 2 (12 innings)
The Yankees' loss gives the Rays the AL East title and a Division Series date with the Texas Rangers, while the Yankees claim the AL wild card and will play the Minnesota Twins in the other ALDS.

Basketball
FIBA World Championship for Women in Karlovy Vary, Czech Republic:
7th place playoff:  76–87 
5th place playoff:  62–74 
3rd place playoff:   77–68 
Final:   89–69  
The USA wins its record eighth title.

Chess
39th Olympiad in Khanty-Mansiysk, Russia:
Open:   19 MP   1 18 MP   17 MP
Ukraine win the title for the second time.
Women:   1 22 MP   18 MP   16 MP
Russia win the title for the first time (as a separate state).

Cricket
Australia in India:
1st Test in Mohali, day 3:  428 (151.4 overs);  405 (108.1 overs; Mitchell Johnson 5/64). India trail by 23 runs.
ICC Intercontinental Cup in Nairobi, day 2:
 464 (105 overs; Nawroz Mangal 168) and 166/5 (38 overs);  160 (39.5 overs; Hamid Hassan 5/70). Afghanistan lead by 470 runs with 5 wickets remaining.

Cycling
UCI Road World Championships in Melbourne and Geelong, Australia:
Men's road race:  Thor Hushovd  6h 21' 49"  Matti Breschel  s.t.  Allan Davis  s.t.

Equestrianism
FEI World Games in Lexington, Kentucky, United States:
Eventing Individual:  Michael Jung  on Sam FBW  William Fox-Pitt  on Cool Mountain  Andrew Nicholson  on Nereo
Eventing Team:

Football (soccer)
2011 FIFA Women's World Cup qualification (UEFA):
Repechage I, first leg:  1–3 
OFC Women's Championship in Auckland, New Zealand:
Group A: (teams in bold advance to the semi-finals)
 0–7 
 0–2 
Final standings: New Zealand 9 points, Cook Islands 6, Tahiti 3, Vanuatu 0.
WAFF Championship in Amman, Jordan:
Final:   1–2  
Kuwait win the title for the first time and deny Iran a fourth successive win.
CAF Champions League semifinals, first leg:
Al-Ahly  2–1  Espérance ST
TP Mazembe  3–1  JS Kabylie
CAF Confederation Cup group stage, matchday 5: (teams in bold advance to the semifinals)
Group A:
Djoliba  1–0  ASFAN
Al-Hilal  2–1  Ittihad
Standings (after 5 matches): Al-Hilal 12 points, Ittihad 9, Djoliba 7, ASFAN 1.

Golf
Ryder Cup in Newport, Wales:  9½–6½ 
Session 3 (four-ball and foursome):
Luke Donald/Lee Westwood  def. Steve Stricker/Tiger Woods  6 & 5
Rory McIlroy/Graeme McDowell  def. Zach Johnson/Hunter Mahan  3 & 1
Pádraig Harrington/Ross Fisher  def. Jim Furyk/Dustin Johnson  2 & 1
Miguel Ángel Jiménez/Peter Hanson  def. Bubba Watson/Jeff Overton  2 up
Stewart Cink/Matt Kuchar  and Francesco Molinari/Edoardo Molinari  match halved
Ian Poulter/Martin Kaymer  def. Phil Mickelson/Rickie Fowler  2 & 1
After further rain delays the start of today's play, it is announced that all singles matches (Session 4) will be held Monday.
PGA Tour Fall Series:
Viking Classic in Madison, Mississippi:
Winner: Bill Haas  273 (−15)
Haas wins his second PGA Tour title of the season and his career.
Champions Tour:
Ensure Classic at Rock Barn in Conover, North Carolina:
Winner: Gary Hallberg  198 (−18)
Hallberg wins his first Champions Tour title.

Horse racing
Prix de l'Arc de Triomphe in Paris:  Workforce (trainer: Michael Stoute, jockey: Ryan L. Moore)  Nakayama Festa (trainer: Yoshitaka Ninomiya, jockey: Masyoshi Ebina)  Sarafina (trainer: Alain de Royer-Dupré, jockey: Gérald Mossé)

Motorcycle racing
Moto GP:
Japanese Grand Prix in Motegi:
MotoGP: (1) Casey Stoner  (Ducati) (2) Andrea Dovizioso  (Honda) (3) Valentino Rossi  (Yamaha)
Riders' championship standings (after 14 of 18 rounds): (1) Jorge Lorenzo  (Yamaha) 297 points (2) Dani Pedrosa  (Honda) 228 (3) Stoner 180
Manufacturers' championship standings: (1) Yamaha 309 points (2) Honda 285 (3) Ducati 220
Moto2: (1) Toni Elías  (Moriwaki) (2) Julián Simón  (Suter) (3) Karel Abrahám  (FTR)
Riders' championship standings (after 13 of 17 rounds): (1) Elías 249 points (2) Simón 168 (3) Andrea Iannone  (Speed Up) 147
Manufacturers' championship standings: (1) Moriwaki 274 points (2) Suter 236 (3) Speed Up 172
125cc: (1) Marc Márquez  (Derbi) (2) Nicolás Terol  (Aprilia) (3) Bradley Smith  (Aprilia)
Riders' championship standings (after 13 of 17 rounds): (1) Terol 228 points (2) Márquez 222 (3) Pol Espargaró  (Derbi) 215
Manufacturers' championship standings: (1) Derbi 310 points (2) Aprilia 271 (3) Honda 19
Superbike:
Magny-Cours World Championship round in Magny-Cours, France:
Race 1: (1) Cal Crutchlow  (Yamaha YZF-R1) (2) Leon Haslam  (Suzuki GSX-R1000) (3) Carlos Checa  (Ducati 1098R)
Race 2: (1) Max Biaggi  (Aprilia RSV 4) (2) Crutchlow (3) Michel Fabrizio  (Ducati 1098R)
Final riders' championship standings: (1) Biaggi 451 points (2) Haslam 376 (3) Checa 297
Final manufacturers' championship standings: (1) Aprilia 471 points (2) Ducati 424 (3) Suzuki 412
Supersport:
Magny-Cours World Championship round in Magny-Cours, France: (1) Eugene Laverty  (Honda CBR600RR) (2) Kenan Sofuoğlu  (Honda CBR600RR) (3) Chaz Davies  (Triumph Daytona 675)
Final riders' championship standings : (1) Sofuoğlu 263 points (2) Laverty 252 (3) Joan Lascorz  (Kawasaki Ninja ZX-6R) 168
Sofuoğlu wins his second world title.
Final manufacturers' championship standings: (1) Honda 320 points (2) Kawasaki 211 (3) Triumph 168

Rugby league
NRL finals series:
Grand Final in Sydney: Sydney Roosters 8–32 St. George Illawarra Dragons
St. George win their first premiership title.

Snooker
Players Tour Championship:
Euro Event 2 in Bruges:
Final: Shaun Murphy  4–2 Matthew Couch 
Murphy wins the tenth professional title of his career.
Order of Merit (after 6 of 12 events): (1) Barry Pinches  17,100 (2) Mark Williams  15,400 (3) Mark Selby  14,900

Tennis
ATP World Tour:
PTT Thailand Open:
Final: Guillermo García López  def. Jarkko Nieminen  6–4, 3–6, 6–4
García López wins his first title of the year and second of his career.
Proton Malaysian Open:
Final: Mikhail Youzhny  def. Andrey Golubev  6–7(2), 6–2, 7–6(3)
Youzhny wins the seventh title of his career.

October 2, 2010 (Saturday)

American football
NCAA:
AP Top 10:
(1) Alabama 31, (7) Florida 6
(2) Ohio State 24, Illinois 13
(3) Boise State 59, New Mexico State 0
(4) Oregon 52, (9) Stanford 31
(5) TCU 27, Colorado State 0
Red River Rivalry: (8) Oklahoma 28, (21) Texas 20
(10) Auburn 52, Louisiana–Monroe 3
Other games:
(24) Michigan State 34, (11) Wisconsin 24
(17) Iowa 24, (22) Penn State 3
Washington 32, (18) USC 31
Virginia Tech 41, (23) North Carolina State 30
Idle: (6) Nebraska

Australian rules football
AFL finals series:
Grand Final Replay in Melbourne:  16.12 (108)–7.10 (52) 
The Magpies collect their 15th premiership and first since 1990.

Auto racing
Nationwide Series:
Kansas Lottery 300 in Kansas City: (1)  Joey Logano (Toyota; Joe Gibbs Racing) (2)  Brad Keselowski (Dodge; Penske Racing) (3)  Kyle Busch (Toyota; Joe Gibbs Racing)
Drivers' championship standings (after 29 of 35 races): (1) Keselowski 4589 points (2)  Carl Edwards (Ford; Roush Fenway Racing) 4215 (3) Busch 4089
IndyCar Series:
Cafés do Brasil Indy 300 in Homestead, Florida: (1) Scott Dixon  (Chip Ganassi Racing) (2) Danica Patrick  (Andretti Autosport) (3) Tony Kanaan  (Andretti Autosport)
Final drivers' championship standings: (1) Dario Franchitti  (Chip Ganassi Racing) 602 points (2) Will Power  (Team Penske) 597 (3) Dixon 547
Franchitti wins his third championship in four years.

Basketball
FIBA World Championship for Women in Karlovy Vary, Czech Republic:
Semifinals:
 81–77 
 106–70 
5th–8th semifinals:
 78–73 
 46–61 
11th place playoff:  71–55 
9th place playoff:  79–84

Cricket
Australia in India:
1st Test in Mohali, day 2:  428 (151.4 overs; Shane Watson 126, Zaheer Khan 5/94);  110/2 (21 overs). India trail by 318 runs with 8 wickets remaining in the 1st innings.
ICC Intercontinental Cup in Nairobi, day 1:
 440/6 (93 overs; Nawroz Mangal 168*); .

Cycling
UCI Road World Championships in Melbourne and Geelong, Victoria, Australia:
Women's road race:  Giorgia Bronzini  3h 32' 01"  Marianne Vos  s.t.  Emma Johansson  s.t.

Figure skating
ISU Junior Grand Prix in Sheffield, Great Britain: (skaters in bold qualify for ISU Junior Grand Prix Final)
Men:  Joshua Farris  187.74  Zhan Bush  172.80  Liam Firus  166.38
Standings (after 5 of 7 events): Andrei Rogozine  30 points (2 events), Farris 28 (2), Max Aaron , Bush 24 (2), Jason Brown , Firus 18 (2), Keiji Tanaka  16 (2), Keegan Messing , Yan Han  15 (1)... Artem Grigoriev  13 (1).
Ice Dance:  Ksenia Monko / Kirill Khaliavin  155.04  Victoria Sinitsina / Ruslan Zhiganshin  133.86  Nicole Orford / Thomas Williams  115.66
Standings (after 5 of 7 events): Monko / Khaliavin, Alexandra Stepanova / Ivan Bukin  30 points (2 events), Sinitsina / Zhiganshin 26 (2), Anastasia Cannuscio / Colin McManus  22 (2), Gabriella Papadakis / Guillaume Cizeron  20 (2), Geraldine Bott / Neil Brown , Lauri Bonacorsi / Travis Mager  18 (2), Charlotte Lichtman / Dean Copley  15 (1)... Ekaterina Pushkash / Jonathan Guerreiro , Anastasia Galyeta / Alexei Shumski  13 (1).

Football (soccer)
2011 FIFA Women's World Cup qualification (UEFA):
Repechage I, first leg:  0–3 
OFC Women's Championship in Auckland, New Zealand:
Group B:
 2–1 
 1–2 
Standings (after 2 matches): Papua New Guinea 6 points, Solomon Islands, Tonga 3 points, Fiji 0.
Caribbean Championship Qualifying Group Stage One:
Group A in Bayamón, Puerto Rico:
 1–1 
 3–1 
CAF Confederation Cup group stage, matchday 5 (teams in bold advance to the semifinals):
Group B:
Zanaco  1–1  FUS Rabat
CS Sfaxien  3–1  Haras El Hodood
Standings (after 5 matches): FUS Rabat, CS Sfaxien 10 points, Zanaco 5, Haras El Hodood 2.
Copa Libertadores de Fútbol Femenino in Barueri, São Paulo, Brazil:
Group A:
Santos  2–0  Caracas
Deportivo Quito  1–1  River Plate

Golf
Ryder Cup in Newport, Wales:  4–6 
Session 1 (four-ball):
Lee Westwood/Martin Kaymer  def. Phil Mickelson/Dustin Johnson  3 & 2
Stewart Cink/Matt Kuchar  and Rory McIlroy/Graeme McDowell  match halved
Steve Stricker/Tiger Woods  def. Ian Poulter/Ross Fisher  2 up
Bubba Watson/Jeff Overton  def. Luke Donald/Pádraig Harrington  3 & 2
Session 2 (foursome):
Zach Johnson/Hunter Mahan  def. Francesco Molinari/Edoardo Molinari  2 up
Lee Westwood/Martin Kaymer  and Jim Furyk/Rickie Fowler  match halved
Pádraig Harrington/Ross Fisher  def. Phil Mickelson/Dustin Johnson  3 & 2
Steve Stricker/Tiger Woods  def. Miguel Ángel Jiménez/Peter Hanson  4 & 3
Ian Poulter/Luke Donald  def. Bubba Watson/Jeff Overton  2 & 1
Stewart Cink/Matt Kuchar  def. Rory McIlroy/Graeme McDowell  1 up
Session 3 (four-ball and foursome):
Luke Donald/Lee Westwood  lead Steve Stricker/Tiger Woods  4 up after 9 holes
Pádraig Harrington/Ross Fisher  lead Jim Furyk/Dustin Johnson  1 up after 8 holes
Rory McIlroy/Graeme McDowell  lead Zach Johnson/Hunter Mahan  3 up after 7 holes
Miguel Ángel Jiménez/Peter Hanson  lead Bubba Watson/Jeff Overton  2 up after 6 holes
Francesco Molinari/Edoardo Molinari  lead Stewart Cink/Matt Kuchar  1 up after 5 holes
Ian Poulter/Martin Kaymer  lead Phil Mickelson/Rickie Fowler  2 up after 4 holes
Play suspended in Session 3 due to darkness. These matches will resume Sunday at 7:45 am BST.

Rugby league
Super League XV:
Grand Final in Manchester: Wigan Warriors 22–10 St. Helens
Wigan win their second Super League title, and 19th title overall.

Tennis
WTA Tour:
Toray Pan Pacific Open:
Final: Caroline Wozniacki  def. Elena Dementieva  1–6, 6–2, 6–3
Wozniacki wins her fifth title of the year and eleventh of her career.

Volleyball
Men's World Championship in Italy: (teams in bold advance to the third round)
Pool G in Catania:  3–1 
Final standings: Italy 4 points,  3, Puerto Rico 2.
Pool H in Milan:  3–0 
Final standings: Serbia 4 points,  3, Mexico 2.
Pool I in Catania:  1–3 
Final standings: Spain 4 points,  3, Egypt 2.
Pool L in Ancona:  3–0 
Final standings: Czech Republic 4 points,  3, Cameroon 2.
Pool M in Milan:  3–1 
Final standings: Argentina 4 points,  3, Japan 2.
Pool N in Ancona:  0–3 
Final standings: Bulgaria 4 points, Brazil 3,  2.

October 1, 2010 (Friday)

Basketball
FIBA World Championship for Women in Karlovy Vary, Czech Republic:
Quarterfinals:
 70–53 
 106–44 
 68–79 
 71–74 (OT) 
9th–12th semifinals:
 59–63 
 58–64

Cricket
Australia in India:
1st Test in Mohali, day 1:  224/5 (90 overs; Shane Watson 101*); .

Cycling
UCI Road World Championships in Melbourne and Geelong, Victoria, Australia:
Men's under-23 road race:  Michael Matthews  4:01:23  John Degenkolb  s.t.  Taylor Phinney  & Guillaume Boivin  s.t.

Equestrianism
FEI World Games in Lexington, Kentucky, United States:
Dressage Grand Prix Freestyle:  Edward Gal  on Moorlands Totilas 91.80%  Laura Bechtolsheimer  on Mistral Hojris 85.35%  Steffen Peters  on Ravel 84.90%

Figure skating
ISU Junior Grand Prix in Sheffield, Great Britain: (skaters in bold qualify for ISU Junior Grand Prix Final)
Ice Dance Short Dance: (1) Ksenia Monko / Kirill Khaliavin  65.12 (2) Victoria Sinitsina / Ruslan Zhiganshin  53.52 (3) Nicole Orford / Thomas Williams  46.51
Pairs:  Ksenia Stolbova / Fedor Klimov  151.64  Narumi Takahashi / Mervin Tran  144.69  Natasha Purich / Raymond Schultz  126.98
Standings (after 2 of 4 events): Stolbova / Klimov 30 points (2 events), Sui Wenjing / Han Cong , Takashi / Tran 13 (1), Yu Xiaoyu / Jin Yang , Purich / Raymond Shultz 11 (1), Taylor Steele / Robert Schultz , Tatiana Danilova / Andrei Novoselov  9 (1).
Ladies:  Adelina Sotnikova  166.70  Yasmin Siraj  161.75  Yuki Nishino  135.58
Standings (after 5 of 7 events): Sotnikova 30 points (2 events), Siraj 26 (2), Kristiene Gong  22 (2), Shion Kokubun  18 (2), Rosa Sheveleva  16 (2), Polina Shelepen , Risa Shoji , Elizaveta Tuktamysheva  15 (1)... Christina Gao , Kiri Baga  13 (1).

Football (soccer)
OFC Women's Championship in Auckland, New Zealand:
Group A:
 5–1 
 0–10 
Standings (after 2 matches): New Zealand 6 points, Tahiti, Cook Islands 3, Vanuatu 0.
WAFF Championship in Amman, Jordan:
Semifinals:
 2–1 
 1–1 (4–3 pen.)

Golf
Ryder Cup in Newport, Wales:  vs. 
Session 1 (four-ball):
Lee Westwood/Martin Kaymer  lead Phil Mickelson/Dustin Johnson  1 up after 12 holes
Stewart Cink/Matt Kuchar  lead Rory McIlroy/Graeme McDowell  2 up after 11 holes
Ian Poulter/Ross Fisher  and Steve Stricker/Tiger Woods  all square after 10 holes
Bubba Watson/Jeff Overton  lead Luke Donald/Pádraig Harrington  1 up after 8 holes
Play is disrupted by rain which kept the players off course for over seven hours, and led to the postponement of the afternoon foursomes until Saturday.

Volleyball
Men's World Championship in Italy: (teams in bold advance to the third round)
Pool G in Catania:  1–3 
Standings: Germany 3 points (2 games), Italy 2 (1),  1 (1).
Pool H in Milan:  0–3 
Standings: Cuba 3 points (2 games),  2 (1), Mexico 1 (1).
Pool I in Catania:  3–2 
Standings: Russia 3 points (2 games), Spain 2 (1),  1 (1).
Pool L in Ancona:  2–3 
Standings: USA 3 points (2 games),  2 (1), Cameroon 1 (1).
Pool M in Milan:  0–3 
Standings: France 3 points (2 games),  2 (1), Japan 1 (1).
Pool N in Ancona:  3–0 
Standings: , Bulgaria 2 points (1 game), Poland 2 (2).

References

X